= Lists of ship launches =

This is an index of lists of ship launches by year.

1000–1099	1100–1199	1200–1299	1300–1399	1400–1499	1500–1599

1600–1609	1610–1619	1620–1629	1630–1639	1640–1649	1650–1659

1660	1661	1662	1663	1664	1665	1666	1667	1668	1669
1670	1671	1672	1673	1674	1675	1676	1677	1678	1679
1680	1681	1682	1683	1684	1685	1686	1687	1688	1689
1690	1691	1692	1693	1694	1695	1696	1697	1698	1699
1700	1701	1702	1703	1704	1705	1706	1707	1708	1709
1710	1711	1712	1713	1714	1715	1716	1717	1718	1719
1720	1721	1722	1723	1724	1725	1726	1727	1728	1729
1730	1731	1732	1733	1734	1735	1736	1737	1738	1739
1740	1741	1742	1743	1744	1745	1746	1747	1748	1749
1750	1751	1752	1753	1754	1755	1756	1757	1758	1759
1760	1761	1762	1763	1764	1765	1766	1767	1768	1769
1770	1771	1772	1773	1774	1775	1776	1777	1778	1779
1780	1781	1782	1783	1784	1785	1786	1787	1788	1789
1790	1791	1792	1793	1794	1795	1796	1797	1798	1799
1800	1801	1802	1803	1804	1805	1806	1807	1808	1809
1810	1811	1812	1813	1814	1815	1816	1817	1818	1819
1820	1821	1822	1823	1824	1825	1826	1827	1828	1829
1830	1831	1832	1833	1834	1835	1836	1837	1838	1839
1840	1841	1842	1843	1844	1845	1846	1847	1848	1849
1850	1851	1852	1853	1854	1855	1856	1857	1858	1859
1860	1861	1862	1863	1864	1865	1866	1867	1868	1869
1870	1871	1872	1873	1874	1875	1876	1877	1878	1879
1880	1881	1882	1883	1884	1885	1886	1887	1888	1889
1890	1891	1892	1893	1894	1895	1896	1897	1898	1899
1900	1901	1902	1903	1904	1905	1906	1907	1908	1909
1910	1911	1912	1913	1914	1915	1916	1917	1918	1919
1920	1921	1922	1923	1924	1925	1926	1927	1928	1929
1930	1931	1932	1933	1934	1935	1936	1937	1938	1939
1940	1941	1942	1943	1944	1945	1946	1947	1948	1949
1950	1951	1952	1953	1954	1955	1956	1957	1958	1959
1960	1961	1962	1963	1964	1965	1966	1967	1968	1969
1970	1971	1972	1973	1974	1975	1976	1977	1978	1979
1980	1981	1982	1983	1984	1985	1986	1987	1988	1989
1990	1991	1992	1993	1994	1995	1996	1997	1998	1999
2000	2001	2002	2003	2004	2005	2006	2007	2008	2009
2010	2011	2012	2013	2014	2015	2016	2017	2018	2019
2020	2021	2022	2023	2024	2025	2026	2027	2028	2029
