= List of ship launches in 1722 =

The list of ship launches in 1722 includes a chronological list of some ships launched in 1722.

Date	Ship	Class	Builder	Location	Country	Notes
January	Bombay	Galley	Thomas Bronsdon	Deptford	Great Britain	For British East India Company.
17 July	Dronning Anna Sophia	Second rate	G Judichaer	Copenhagen	Denmark	For Dano-Norwegian Navy.
19 July	Burford	Third rate	Richard Stacey	Deptford Dockyard	Great Britain	For Royal Navy.
19 July	Scarborough	Sixth rate	Richard Stacey	Sheerness Dockyard	Great Britain	For Royal Navy.
September	Thétis	Sixth rate		Le Havre	Kingdom of France	For French Navy.
14 November	Solide	Third rate	Rene Levasseur	Toulon	Kingdom of France	For French Navy.
November	Élisabeth	Éclatant-class ship of the line	Laurent Hebe	Brest	Great Britain	For French Navy.
11 December	Compton	East Indiaman	Thomas Bronsdon	Deptford	Great Britain	For British East India Company.
Unknown date	Bengal	Galley	Thomas Bronsdon	Deptford	Great Britain	For British East India Company.
Unknown date	Fort Saint George	Galley			Great Britain	For British East India Company.
Unknown date	Gallo Indiano	Third rate			Spain	For Spanish Navy.
Unknown date	Kasteel van Egmond	Third rate		Hoorn	Dutch Republic	For Dutch Navy.
Unknown date	Réale	Galley		Marseille	Kingdom of France	For French Navy.
Unknown date	Saint Philippe	Saint Philippe-class ship of the line		Rochefort	Kingdom of France	For French Navy.
Unknown date	Héroine	Galley	Jean-Baptiste Chabert	Marseille	Kingdom of France	For French Navy.
Unknown date	Polanen	Fourth rate	Jan van Rheenen	Amsterdam	Dutch Republic	For Dutch Navy.
Unknown date	Wapen von Hamburg	Fourth rate	Admiralitätswerft	Hamburg	Hamburg	For Hanseatic League.
Unknown date	Westerbeek	Sailing ship		Amsterdam	Dutch Republic	For Dutch East India Company.
