= List of ship launches in 1662 =

The list of ship launches in 1662 includes a chronological list of some ships launched in 1662.

Date	Ship	Class	Builder	Location	Country	Notes
Unknown	HMY Anne	Royal yacht	Christopher Pett	Woolwich	England	For Royal Navy.
