= List of ship launches in 1661 =

The list of ship launches in 1661 includes a chronological list of some ships launched in 1661.

Date	Ship	Class	Builder	Location	Country	Notes
Unknown date	Anne	Royal yacht	Christopher Pett	Woolwich	England	For English Navy.
