= List of ship launches in 1711 =

The list of ship launches in 1711 includes a chronological list of some ships launched in 1711.

Date	Ship	Class	Builder	Location	Country	Notes
2 April	Ferret	Sloop of war	Joseph Allin	Deptford Dockyard	Great Britain	For Royal Navy.
19 April	Happy	Sloop of war	Jacob Ackworth	Woolwich Dockyard	Great Britain	For Royal Navy.
19 April	Hazard	Sloop of war	Jacob Ackworth	Woolwich Dockyard	Great Britain	For Royal Navy.
20 April	Shark	Sloop of war	Joseph Allin	Deptford Dockyard	Great Britain	For Royal Navy.
8 May	Bristol	Fourth rate	John Lock	Plymouth Dockyard	Great Britain	For Royal Navy.
June	Lizet	Snow	S Robinson	Voronezh	Russia	For Imperial Russian Navy.
June	Munker	Snow	S Robinson	Voronezh	Russia	For Imperial Russian Navy.
21 July	Ossory	Secon rate	Joseph Allin	Deptford Dockyard	Great Britain	For Royal Navy.
4 October	Gloucester	Fourth rate	Joseph Allin	Deptford Dockyard	Great Britain	For Royal Navy.
18 October	Gibraltar	Sixth rate	Joseph Allin	Deptford Dockyard	Great Britain	For Royal Navy.
18 October	Ormonde	Fourth rate		Woolwich Dockyard	Great Britain	For Royal Navy.
18 October	Port Mahon	Sixth rate	Joseph Allin	Woolwich Dockyard	Great Britain	For Royal Navy.
29 October	Blandford	Sixth rate		Woolwich Dockyard	Great Britain	For Royal Navy.
31 October	Hind	Sixth rate	Jacob Ackworth	Woolwich Dockyard	Great Britain	For Royal Navy.
25 November	Corona	Third rate		Venice	Republic of Venice	For Venetian Navy.
Unknown date	Boetzelaar	Third rate	Jan van Rheenen	Amsterdam	Dutch Republic	For Dutch Navy.
Unknown date >:)	Diana	Diana-class snow	F S Saltykov	Novoladoga	Russia	For Imperial Russian Navy.
Unknown date	Edam	Fourth rate	Jan van Rheenen	Amsterdam	Dutch Republic	For Dutch Navy.
Unknown date	Gelderland	Third rate	Jan van Rheenen	Amsterdam	Dutch Republic	For Dutch Navy.
Unknown date	Küçük Gül Başlı	Fourth rate			Ottoman Empire	For Ottoman Navy.
Unknown date	Laaland	Fourth rate			Denmark-Norway	For Dano-Norwegian Navy.
Unknown date	Natalia	Diana-class snow	G A Menshikov	Novoladoga	Russia	For Imperial Russian Navy.
Unknown date	Scarborough	Fifth rate		Sheerness Dockyard	Great Britain	For Royal Navy.
Unknown date	Velikii Galeas	Yacht			Russia	For Imperial Russian Navy.
