= List of ship launches in 1729 =

The list of ship launches in 1729 includes a chronological list of some ships launched in 1729.

Date	Ship	Class	Builder	Location	Country	Notes
14 February	Galera Victoria	Galleon		Guarnizo	Spain	For Spanish Navy.
14 February	Santa Ana	Third rate	Ciprián Autrán	Guarnizo	Spain	For Spanish Navy.
14 July	Reina	Third rate	Ciprián Autrán	Guarnizo	Spain	For Spanish Navy.
Unknown date	Hayling	Hoy		Portsmouth Dockyard	Great Britain	For Royal Navy.
Unknown date	Hilverbeek	Fourth rate	Thomas Davis	Amsterdam	Dutch Republic	For Dutch Navy.
Unknown date	Légère	Sybill-class barque latine		Toulon	Kingdom of France	For French Navy.
Unknown date	Somme	Sixth rate	Jacques Poirier	Le Havre	Kingdom of France	For French Navy.
Unknown date	Principe	Third rate	Ciprián Autrán	Guarnizo	Spain	For Spanish Navy.
