= List of ship launches in 1719 =

The list of ship launches in 1719 includes a chronological list of all ships launched in 1719.

Date	Ship	Class	Builder	Location	Country	Notes
13 February	Dursley Galley	Sixth rate	Richard Stacey	Deptford Dockyard	Great Britain	For Royal Navy.
13 February	Greyhound	Sixth rate	Richard Stacey	Deptford Dockyard	Great Britain	For Royal Navy.
16 May	Trial	Sloop of War	Joseph Allin	Deptford Dockyard	Great Britain	For Royal Navy.
13 June	Catalan	Third rate		Barcelona	Spain	For Spanish Navy.
September	Bridgewater	East Indiaman		London	Great Britain	For British East India Company.
October	Cassandra	East Indiaman	Bronsdon's Yard	Deptford	Great Britain	For British East India Company.
October	Chandos	East Indiaman		London	Great Britain	For British East India Company.
Unknown date	Bucintoro	State barge			Republic of Venice	For Venetian Navy.
Unknown date	Gangut	Second rate		Saint Petersburg	Russia	For Imperial Russian Navy (Гангут).
Unknown date	Gouda	Third rate	Jan van Rheenen	Amsterdam	Dutch Republic	For Dutch Navy.
Unknown date	Colombe	Fie-class gabarre	Laurent Helie	Brest	Kingdom of France	For French Navy.
Unknown date	Fie	Fie-class gabarre	Laurent Helie	Brest	Kingdom of France	For French Navy.
Unknown date	Tourterelle	Fie-class gabarre	Laurent Helie	Brest	Kingdom of France	For French Navy.
Unknown date	Zoeterwoude	Third rate	Jan van Rheenen	Amsterdam	Dutch Republic	For Dutch Navy.
Unknown date	Ravesteyn	East Indiaman		Middelburg	Dutch Republic	Ordered in 1719 for the Chamber of Zeeland of the Dutch East India Company.
Unknown date	Midloo	East Indiaman		Amsterdam	Dutch Republic	Ordered in 1719 for the Chamber of Amsterdam of the Dutch East India Company.
Unknown date	Bleijenburg	East Indiaman		Amsterdam	Dutch Republic	Ordered in 1719 for the Chamber of Amsterdam of the Dutch East India Company.
Unknown date	Nieuwvliet	East Indiaman		Middelburg	Dutch Republic	Ordered in 1719 for the Chamber of Zeeland of the Dutch East India Company.
Unknown date	Goudriaan	Fluyt-variant (in Dutch: hekboot)		Delftshaven	Dutch Republic	Ordered in 1719 for the Chamber of Delft of the Dutch East India Company.
Unknown date	Valkenbos	Fluyt		Rotterdam	Dutch Republic	Ordered in 1719 for the Chamber of Rotterdam of the Dutch East India Company.
Unknown date	Magdalena	Fluyt		Hoorn	Dutch Republic	Ordered in 1719 for the Chamber of Hoorn of the Dutch East India Company.
