= Ravesteyn =

Dutch ship (1719–1726)

History

Dutch Republic
- Name: Ravesteyn
- Namesake: Buitenplaats "Ravestein"
- Owner: Dutch East India Company; Chamber of Zeeland
- Completed: 1719
- Fate: Sank on 8 May 1726

General characteristics
- Type: East Indiaman
- Length: 145 feet
- Capacity: loading capacity: 400 last (800 tons)

Ravesteyn, also written as Ravensteyn, Ravenstein or Ravestein, was an 18th-century East Indiaman of the Dutch East India Company.

Ravesteyn was a merchant ship and went to among others Batavia, the Dutch East Indies and to Guangzhou, China. During a voyage from the Dutch Republic to China, she went off course and wrecked in the night of 8-9 May 1726 at Ari Atoll, Maldives. The wreck was discovered in 1997 and after research her final voyage was reconstructed.

== Ship details ==
Ravesteyn was built in 1719 in Middelburg for the Chamber of Zeeland. She was made of wood, 145 foot long and had a loading capacity of 400 last (800 tons). The ship had 200-250 crew members and 40 guns.

Ravesteyn has its name of the buitenplaats "Ravestein" near Grijpskerke on Walcheren in Zeeland.

== History and fate ==
On 8 March 1719, during the spring meeting of the Heren XVII, the central administration of the Dutch East India Company, it was decided that seven ships would be built. The names were already determined at that meeting and were next to Ravesteyn: Bleijenburg, Midloo, Nieuwvliet, Goudriaan, Valkenbos and Magdalena.

After being built in 1719 in Middelburg, she had her first voyage to Batavia, Dutch East Indies in 1721. On 15 February 1721 she departed from Fort Rammekens under command of Reinier Hijpe. She had an intermediate stop at Cape of Good Hope for over a month between 4 June and 11 July 1721. At Cape of Good Hope she arrived with 212 crew members. Ravesteyn arrived at Batavia on 2 September 1721.

From Batavia, she made several voyages. On 23 September 1721, she went to Tagal with 18,000 rds in cash and returned on 15 October 1721 with a cargo of rice. On 31 October 1721, she went to Cape of Good Hope and returned on 17 May 1722. With a fleet consisting of the ships Ravesteyn, Haarlem and Zuiderbeek including the new VOC director Abraham Weyns she went to Suratte departing on 14 August 1722. She returned to Batavia the next year on 9 May 1723. On 10 June 1723, she went to Bantam and returned on 24 June 1723 with a cargo of pepper.

On 2 August 1723, she was part of a fleet consisting of Ravesteyn, Kockenge, Nieuwvliet and Midloo that went to Guangzhou, China under command of Johan Paul Schagen. On 28 November 1723, she returned to Rammekens, Dutch Republic under command of Albert Bovet where she arrived on 5 July 1724 after a two month intermediate stop at Cape of Good Hope.

On 27 May 1725, she departed again for a voyage to China, under command of Anthonie Klink and had a regular intermediate stop at Cape of Good Hope from 9 December 1725 to 8 January 1726. The ship went off course during the night of 8-9 May 1726, she wrecked at the Gangehi Maavaru reef of Ari Atoll, Maldives. Eight chests of silver (30,000 Dutch payments) and 1 chest of gold (26,000 gold ducats) were recovered. The place is unusual as the Netherlands had no business there at the time and it was a dangerous area to sail. The journey has later been reconstructed.

== Wreck ==
The ship Ravesteyn is depicted with its wreck location on a map from 1775 of Ari Atol.

On 9 February 1997, the wreck was discovered by Dutch historian Ruud Paesie. Multiple items were salvaged including a four metres long anchor, cannon, Dutch glass and pottery and Gouda pipes made by Jan (or Leendert) van der Jagt in 1710.

== Research ==
Ruud Paesie did extensive research into the fate of the Ravensteyn. From available archive material from the Netherlands, South Africa, Malidives and Sri Lanka he reconstructed the last voyage and the fate of the crew.
