= List of ship launches in 1675 =

The list of ship launches in 1675 includes a chronological list of some ships launched in 1675.

Date	Ship	Class	Builder	Location	Country	Notes
11 June	Lark	Sixth rate	Anthony Dean	Blackwall	England	For Royal Navy.
20 June	Triomphant	Ship of the line		Brest	Kingdom of France	For French Navy.
27 June	Royal James	First rate	Daniel Furzer, Portsmouth Dockyard	Portsmouth	England	For Royal Navy.
June	Sapphire	Fifth rate	Anthony Deane	Harwich	England	For Royal Navy.
2 December	Madonna della Salute	Fourth rate	Stefano Cont	Venice	Republic of Venice	For Venetian Navy.
Unknown date	Blauwe Jacht	Jacht	Jan Groen	Amsterdam	Dutch Republic	For Dutch Republic Navy.
Unknown date	Blessing	Sloop		London	England	For British East India Company.
Unknown date	Bonte Haan	Unrated snow	Jan Groen	Amsterdam	Dutch Republic	For Dutch Republic Navy.
Unknown date	Defiance	Third rate	Phineas Pett, Chatham Dockyard	Chatham	England	For Royal Navy.
Unknown date	Bruinvis	Sixth rate frigate	Jan Groen	Amsterdam	Dutch Republic	For Dutch Republic Navy.
Unknown date	Harderin	Unrated full-rigged ship			Dutch Republic	For Dutch Republic Navy.
Unknown date	Kingfisher	Fourth rate	Phineas Pett, Woolwich Dockyard	Woolwich	England	For Royal Navy.
Unknown date	Neptunus	Sixth rate		Dunkerque	Kingdom of France	For Dutch Republic Navy.
Unknown date	Woolwich	Fourth rate	Phineas Pett, Woolwich Dockyard	Woolwich	Kingdom of England	For Royal Navy.
Unknown date	Wulpenburg	fifth rate frigate	Jan van Rheenen, Amsterdam Naval Yard	Amsterdam	Dutch Republic	For Dutch Republic Navy.
