= List of ship launches in 1677 =

The list of ship launches in 1677 includes a chronological list of some ships launched in 1677.

Date	Ship	Class	Builder	Location	Country	Notes
November	Comte	Fourth rate	Pierre Le Brun	Brest	Kingdom of France	For French Navy.
Unknown date	Comte de Vermandois	Unrated			Kingdom of France	For Dutch Republic Navy.
Unknown date	Elswoud	Third Rate			Dutch Republic	For Dutch Republic Navy.
Unknown date	Kievit	Sixth rate		Rotterdam	Dutch Republic	For Dutch Republic Navy.
Unknown date	Mary	Yacht	Phineas Pett, Chatham Dockyard	Chatham	England	For Royal Navy.
Unknown date	Wakende Kraan	First rate		Rotterdam	Dutch Republic	For Dutch Republic Navy.
