= List of ship launches in 1684 =

The list of ship launches in 1684 includes a chronological list of some ships launched in 1684.

Date	Ship	Class	Builder	Location	Country	Notes
2 January	St. Nicholas	Ship of the line		Venice	Republic of Venice	For Venetian Navy.
15 March	Ercole Vittorioso	Fourth rate	Paolo di Ottavio Corso	Venice	Republic of Venice	For Venetian Navy.
16 March	San Marco Grande	Third rate	Iseppo di Piero de Pieri	Venice	Republic of Venice	For Venetian Navy.
1 April	Vermandois	Third rate	Etienne Hubac	Brest	Kingdom of France	For French Navy.
23 October	Furieux	Third rate	Blaise Pangalo	Brest	Kingdom of France	For French Navy.
17 November	Gaillard	Fourth rate	Etienne Salicon	Le Havre	Kingdom of France	For French Navy.
Unknown date	Lossen	Frigate		Fredrikstad	Denmark-Norway	For Dano-Norwegian Navy.
Unknown date	Sant'Antonio da Padova	Sant'Antonio da Padova-class ship of the line		Venice	Republic of Venice	For Venetian Navy.
Unknown date	Zeelandia	Second rate	Josias Pietersen	Vlissingen	Dutch Republic	For Dutch Republic Navy.
