= List of ship launches in 1686 =

The list of ship launches in 1686 includes a chronological list of some ships launched in 1686.

Date	Ship	Class	Builder	Location	Country	Notes
27 February	San Domenico	Fourth rate	Paolo di Ottavio Corso	Venice	Republic of Venice	For Venetian Navy.
23 April	Redentor del Mondo	Giove Fulminante-class ship of the line	Iseppo di Piero de Pieri	Venice	Republic of Venice	For Venetian Navy.
October	Courtisan	Third rate	Honoré Mallet	Rochefort	Kingdom of France	For French Navy.
14 December	Saint Michel	Fourth rate	Etienne Salicon	Le Havre	Kingdom of France	For French Navy.
23 December	Content	Third rate	Blaise Pangalo	Toulon	Kingdom of France	For French Navy.
Unknown date	Beemster	Fourth rate	Jean Lis	Amsterdam	Dutch Republic	For Dutch Republic Navy.
Unknown date	L'Éclair	Privateer fireship		Toulon	Kingdom of France	For private owner.
Unknown date	Prins Friderich	Second rate			Denmark	For Dano-Norwegian Navy.
Unknown date	Wapen von Hamburg	Fourth rate frigate	Admiraltätswerft	Hamburg	Hamburg	For Hanseatic League.
