= List of ship launches in 1737 =

The list of ship launches in 1737 includes a chronological list of some ships launched in 1737.

Date	Ship	Class	Builder	Location	Country	Notes
23 February	Victory	First rate	Joseph Allin	Portsmouth Dockyard	Great Britain	For Royal Navy.
5 July	Anglelsea	East Indiaman	William Hoskings	Rotherhithe	Great Britain	For British East India Company.
15 September	Augusta	East Indiaman	Peter Bronsdon	Deptford	Great Britain	For British East India Company.
24 October	Le Duc d'Orleans	East Indiaman	Gilles Cambry	Lorient	Kingdom of France	For French East India Company.
Unknown date	Astraea	Sixth rate		Havana	(Spain) Cuba	For Spanish Navy.
Unknown date	Galera Diedo	Galley			Republic of Venice	For Venetian Navy.
Unknown date	Prince Augustus	Grab		Bombay	India	For British East India Company.
Unknown date	Şeşpay-i Bahri	Third rate		Sinop	Ottoman Empire	For Ottoman Navy.
