= List of ship launches in 1713 =

The list of ship launches in 1713 includes a chronological list of some ships launched in 1713.

Date	Ship	Class	Builder	Location	Country	Notes
28 May	Lively	Sixth rate	John Phillips	Portsmouth Dockyard	Great Britain	For Royal Navy.
August	Borneo	East Indiaman		River Thames	Great Britain	For British East India Company.
Unknown date	Elefanten	Sixth rate Praam		Härnösand	Sweden	For Royal Swedish Navy.
Unknown date	Ter Meer	Fourth rate	Jan van Rheenen	Amsterdam	Dutch Republic	For Dutch Navy.
