= List of ship launches in 1700 =

The list of ship launches in 1700 includes a chronological list of some ships launched in 1700.

Date	Ship	Class	Builder	Location	Country	Notes
24 April	Cherepakha	Fourth rate	Joseph Noy	Voronezh	Russia	For Imperial Russian Navy.
27 April	Goto Predestinatsia	Fourth rate	F M Skylaev	Voronezh	Russia	For Imperial Russian Navy.
21 September	Peregrine Galley	Sixth rate	William Lee	Sheerness Dockyard	England	For Royal Navy.
October	Amphitrite	Fourth rate	René Levasseur	Dunkirk	Kingdom of France	For French Navy.
Unknown date	Advice Frigate	Frigate	Blackwall Yard	Blackwall	England	For British East India Company.
Unknown date	Deventer	Fourth rate		Enkhuizen	Dutch Republic	For Dutch Navy.
Unknown date	Diepenheim	Fourth rate	Hendrik Cardinaal	Amsterdam	Dutch Republic	For Dutch Navy.
Unknown date	Hof Rheenen	Fourth rate	Hendrik Cardinaal	Amsterdam	Dutch Republic	For Dutch Navy.
Unknown date	Hound	Sloop of war	Samuel Miller	Deptford Dockyard	England	For Royal Navy.
Unknown date	Iozh	Sixth rate	D Feykes	Khoper	Russia	For Imperial Russian Navy.
Unknown date	Keizerswaard	Fourth rate	Hendrik Cardinaal	Amsterdam	Dutch Republic	For Dutch Navy.
Unknown date	Leeuw	Third Rate	Hendrik Cardinaal	Amsterdam	Dutch Republic	For Dutch Navy.
Unknown date	Ferme	Third rate	Honoré Mallet	Rochefort	Kingdom of France	For French Navy.
Unknown date	Héros	Fourth rate		Lorient	Kingdom of France	For French Navy.
Unknown date	Nieuwenhuis	Fourth rate	Hendrik Cardinaal	Amsterdam	Dutch Republic	For Dutch Navy.
Unknown date	Otter	Sloop of war	Samuel Miller	Deptford Dockyard	England	For Royal Navy.
Unknown date	Rhenen	Fourth rate			Dutch Republic	For Dutch Navy.
Unknown date	Saint Lo	Yacht	Thomas Podd	Plymouth	England	For Royal Navy.
Unknown date	Shnau	Snow	I Fedotov	Ramonskaya	Russia	For Imperial Russian Navy.
