= List of ship launches in 1685 =

The list of ship launches in 1685 includes a chronological list of some ships launched in 1685.

Date	Ship	Class	Builder	Location	Country	Notes
4 March	Marquis	Third rate	Laurent Coulomb	Toulon	Kingdom of France	For French Navy.
4 April	San Andrea	Sant Andrea-class ship of the line	Zuanne di Piero de Pieri	Venice	Republic of Venice	For Venetian Navy.
4 April	San Nicolò	Drago Allungati-class ship of the line	Stefano Conti	Venice	Republic of Venice	For Venetian Navy.
12 April	Magnifique	Second rate	François Chapelle	Toulon	Kingdom of France	For French Navy.
18 April	Sant Iseppo	Drago Volante-class ship of the line	Antonio Filetto	Venice	Republic of Venice	For Venetian Navy.
23 May	Coronation	Second rate	Isaac Betts, Portsmouth Dockyard	Portsmouth	England	For Royal Navy.
December	Sans Pareil	Fourth rate	Etienne Salicon	Le Havre	Kingdom of France	For French Navy.
Unknown date	Catharina	Fourth rate	Jean Lis	Amsterdam	Dutch Republic	For Dutch Republic Navy.
Unknown date	Friesland	Third rate	Simon Janssen Lis, Amsterdam Naval Yard	Amsterdam	Dutch Republic	For Dutch Republic Navy.
Unknown date	Modéré	Fourth rate	Hendrick Houvens	Dunkerque	Kingdom of France	For French Navy.
Unknown date	Madonna dei Sette Dolori	Bomb vessel			Republic of Venice	For Venetian Navy.
Unknown date	Maria Elisabeth	Fourth rate			Dutch Republic	For Dutch Republic Navy.
Unknown date	Natività	Bomb vessel			Republic of Venice	For Venetian Navy.
Unknown date	San Antonio Abate	Bomb vessel			Republic of Venice	For Venetian Navy.
Unknown date	Zeeland	Third rate			Dutch Republic	For Dutch Republic Navy.
Unknown date	Zeelandia	Third rate			Dutch Republic	For Dutch Republic Navy.
