= List of ship launches in 1725 =

The list of ship launches in 1725 includes a chronological list of some ships launched in 1725.

Date	Ship	Class	Builder	Location	Country	Notes
May	Gloire	Fifth rate	Jacques Poirier	Le Havre	Kingdom of France	For French Navy.
10 July	Happy	Sloop-of-war	Richard Stacey	Deptford Dockyard	Great Britain	For Royal Navy.
August	Aimable	Third rate	Laurent Helie	Brest	Kingdom of France	For French Navy.
September	Juste	Saint Philippe-class ship of the line		Rochefort	Kingdom of France	For French Navy.
Unknown date	Beemsterlust	Fourth rate	Gerbrand Slegt	Amsterdam	Dutch Republic	For Dutch Navy.
Unknown date	Hollandia	Third rate	Gerbrand Slegt	Amsterdam	Dutch Republic	For Dutch Navy.
Unknown date	Kasteel van Medemblik	Fourth rate	Jan Pool	Medemblik	Dutch Republic	For Royal Navy.
Unknown date	Oud Teylingen	Fourth rate	Paulus van Zwijndrecht	Rotterdam	Dutch Republic	For Dutch Navy.
Unknown date	Ramhorst	Fourth rate	Jan Pool	Enkhuizen	Dutch Republic	For Dutch Navy.
Unknown date	Slesvig	Fourth rate			Denmark	For Dano-Norwegian Navy.
Unknown date	Supply	Hoy	Benjamin Rosewell	Chatham Dockyard	Great Britain	For Royal Navy.
Unknown date	Twickel	Fourth rate	van Zwijndrecht	Rotterdam	Dutch Republic	For Dutch Navy.
Unknown date	Valkenburg	Fourth rate	Gerbrand Slegt	Amsterdam	Dutch Republic	For Dutch Navy.
Unknown date	Zeewijk	East Indiaman			Dutch Republic	For Dutch East India Company.
