= List of ship launches in 1715 =

The list of ship launches in 1715 includes a chronological list of some ships launched in 1715.

Date	Ship	Class	Builder	Location	Country	Notes
21 January	San Lorenzo Zustinian	San Lorenzo Zustinian-class ship of the line	Girolamo Veruda di Zuanne	Venice	Republic of Venice	For Venetian Navy.
1 March	Regina del Mar	San Lorenzo Zustinian-class ship of the line	Antonio Veruda di Iseppo	Venice	Republic of Venice	For Venetian Navy.
1 March	Terror	San Lorenzo Zustinian-class ship of the line	Zuanne Monello	Venice	Republic of Venice	For Venetian Navy.
27 April	Iupiter	Bomb vessel	Joseph Noy	Saint Petersburg	Russia	For Imperial Russian Navy.
20 June	San Lorenzo Giustiniano			Venice	Republic of Venice	For Venetian Navy.
23 July	Trionfo	San Lorenzo Zustinian-class ship of the line	Zuanne de Francesco Venturini	Venice	Republic of Venice	For Venetian Navy.
29 August	Scudo della Fede	Scudo della Fede-class ship of the line	Francesco di Angelo di Ponte	Venice	Republic of Venice	For Venetian Navy.
15 September	Venezia Trionfante	Scudo della Fede-class ship of the line	Francesco di Angelo di Ponte	Venice	Republic of Venice	For Venetian Navy.
September	British Merchant	East Indiaman		River Thames	Great Britain	For British East India Company.
Unknown date	Akrep Başlı	Third rate			Ottoman Empire	For Ottoman Navy.
Unknown date	Al At Başlı	Fourth rate			Ottoman Empire	For Ottoman Navy.
Unknown date	Fenix Lilla	Sixth rate		Stralsund	Stralsund	For Royal Swedish Navy.
Unknown date	Kebir Üç Ambarlı	First rate			Ottoman Empire	For Ottoman Navy.
Unknown date	Ejder Başlı	Third rate			Ottoman Empire	For Ottoman Navy.
Unknown date	Kiskin	Sixth rate Felucca		Stralsund	Stralsund	For Royal Swedish Navy.
Unknown date	Cosse d'Angélique	Frégate légère	Philippe Cochois	Le Havre	France	For French Navy.
Unknown date	Nordstiernen	Third rate			Denmark-Norway	For Dano-Norwegian Navy.
Unknown date	Packan	Sixth rate		Stralsund	Stralsund	For Royal Swedish Navy.
Unknown date	Purmer	Third rate	Jan van Rheenen	Amsterdam	Dutch Republic	For Dutch Navy.
Unknown date	Santa Rosa	Galleon	Ribeira das Naus Shipyard	Lisbon	Portugal	For Portuguese Navy.
Unknown date	Snappup	Brigantine		Stralsund	Stralsund	For Royal Swedish Navy.
