= List of ship launches in 1690 =

The list of ship launches in 1690 includes a chronological list of some ships launched in 1690.

Date	Ship	Class	Builder	Location	Country	Notes
January	Brillant	Third rate	Etienne Salicon	Le Havre	Kingdom of France	For French Navy.
March	Aimable	Second rate	Honoré Mallet	Rochefort	Kingdom of France	For French Navy.
March	Intrépide	Second rate	Honoré Mallet	Rochefort	Kingdom of France	For French Navy.
March	Pembroke	Fifth rate frigate		Deptford	England	For Royal Navy.
April	Invincible	Superbe-class ship of the line	François Coulomb	Toulon	Kingdom of France	For French Navy.
24 May	Saint Esprit	Second rate	Blaise Pangalo	Brest	Kingdom of France	For French Navy.
May	Nettuno	Sant'Antonio da Padova-class ship of the line		Venice	Republic of Venice	For Venetian Navy.
28 November	Constant	Third rate	François Coulomb	Toulon	Kingdom of France	For French Navy.
29 November	Dreadnought	Third rate	Henry Johnson, Blackwall Yard	Blackwall	England	For Royal Navy.
November	Heureux	Second rate	François Coulomb	Toulon	Kingdom of France	For French Navy.
December	Perle	Fourth rate	Jean-Armand Levasseur	Dunkerque	Kingdom of France	For French Navy.
December	Laurier	Laurier-class ship of the line	Pierre Masson	Bayonne	Kingdom of France	For French Navy.
Unknown date	Admiraltät	Fourth rate frigate	Admiraltătswerft	Hamburg	Hamburg	For Hanseatic League.
Unknown date	Beschermer	Second rate		Enkhuizen	Dutch Republic	For Dutch Republic Navy.
Unknown date	Buis	Third rate		Medemblik	Dutch Republic	For Dutch Republic Navy.
Unknown date	Dolfijn	Sixth rate frigate		Rotterdam	Dutch Republic	For Dutch Republic Navy.
Unknown date	Friesland	Third rate			Dutch Republic	For Dutch Republic Navy.
Unknown date	Goes	Fourth rate	Jacob Matthijssen Oosterlind	Veere	Dutch Republic	For Dutch Republic Navy.
Unknown date	Noorderkwartier	Second rate		Hoorn	Dutch Republic	For Dutch Republic Navy.
Unknown date	Superbe	Superbe-class ship of the line	François Coulomb	Toulon	Kingdom of France	For French Navy.
Unknown date	Schermer	Fourth rate		Amsterdam	Dutch Republic	For Dutch Republic Navy.
Unknown date	Wapen van de Schermer	Fourth rate			Dutch Republic	For Dutch Republic Navy.
Unknown date	Zeelandia	Third rate		Amsterdam	Dutch Republic	For Dutch Republic Navy.
Unknown date	Zeepost	Sixth rate		Zeeland	Dutch Republic	For Dutch Republic Navy.
