= List of ship launches in 1665 =

The list of ship launches in 1665 includes a chronological list of some ships launched in 1665.

Date	Ship	Class	Builder	Location	Country	Notes
22 November	Bourbon	Third rate ship of the line	Aunis	Rochefort	Kingdom of France	For French Navy.
Unknown	Nyckeln	Second rate ship of the line	Bodekull	Karlshamn	Kingdom of Sweden	For Royal Swedish Navy.
Unknown	De Zeven Provinciën	Second rate ship of the line	Jan Salomonszoon van den Tempel	Rotterdam	Dutch Republic	For Dutch Navy.
Unknown	Thérèse	Third rate ship of the line		Toulon	Kingdom of France	For French Navy.
Unknown	Duc	Fourth rate ship of the line	Laurent Hubac	Brest	Kingdom of France	For French Navy.
Unknown	Little Victory	Fifth rate frigate			England	For English Navy.
Unknown	Aurore	Frigate		Brest	Kingdom of France	For French Navy.
