= List of ship launches in 1731 =

The list of ship launches in 1731 includes a chronological list of some ships launched in 1731.

| Date | Ship | Class | Builder | Location | Country | Notes |
|---|---|---|---|---|---|---|
| 28 January | Bedford | East Indiaman | Abraham Wells | Blackwall | Great Britain | For British East India Company. |
| 13 April | Buckingham | Third rate | Richard Stacey | Deptford Dockyard | Great Britain | For Royal Navy. |
| 19 August | Leon | Third rate | Lorenzo Arzueta | Ferrol | Spain | For Spanish Navy. |
| 21 October | Grampus | Sloop-of-war | John Hayward | Woolwich Dockyard | Great Britain | For Royal Navy. |
| 23 October | Somerset | Third rate | | Woolwich Dockyard | Great Britain | For Royal Navy. |
| October | Britannia | East Indiaman | Thomas West | London | Great Britain | For British East India Company. |
| 20 November | Wolf | Sloop-of-war | Richard Stacey | Deptford Dockyard | Great Britain | For Royal Navy. |
| Unknown date | Brederode | Fourth rate | Thomas Davis | Amsterdam | Dutch Republic | For Dutch Navy. |
| Unknown date | Delft | Fourth rate | | Rotterdam | Dutch Republic | For Dutch Navy. |
| Unknown date | Hofwegen | East Indiaman | | Rotterdam | Dutch Republic | For Dutch East India Company. |
| Unknown date | Charente | Somme-class en flûte | Jacques Poirier | Le Havre | Kingdom of France | For French Navy. |
| Unknown date | Leiderdorp | Fourth rate | Thomas Davis | Amsterdam | Dutch Republic | For Dutch Navy. |
| Unknown date | Saint Louis | Brig | Adrien Gilbert | New Orleans | (Kingdom of France) French Louisiana | For French Navy. |
| Unknown date | Prindsesse Charlotte Amalie | Fourth rate | | | Denmark–Norway | For Dano-Norwegian Navy. |
| Unknown date | Prindsesse Lovise | Fourth rate | | | Denmark–Norway | For Dano-Norwegian Navy. |
| Unknown date | Spiegelbos | Sixth rate | Thomas Davis | Amsterdam | Dutch Republic | For Dutch Navy. |
| Unknown date | Vrijheid | Third rate | Thomas Davis | Amsterdam | Dutch Republic | For Dutch Navy. |
