= List of ship launches in 1714 =

The list of ship launches in 1714 includes a chronological list of some ships launched in 1714.

Date	Ship	Class	Builder	Location	Country	Notes
27 April	Printsessa	Snow		Saint Petersburg	Tsardom of Russia	For Imperial Russian Navy.
16 July	Strafford	Fourth rate	Phillips	Plymouth Dockyard	Kingdom of Great Britain	For Royal Navy.
29 September	Madonna della Salute	San Lorenzo Zustinian-class ship of the line	Iseppi Depieri de Zuanne	Venice	Republic of Venice	For Venetian Navy.
31 October	Narva	Sviataia Ekaterina-class ship of the line	Fedrosee / F M Skylaev	Saint Petersburg	Tsardom of Russia	For Imperial Russian Navy.
December	Toulouse	Third rate	Françcois Coulomb	Toulon	Kingdom of France	For French Navy.
Unknown date	Achilles	Fifth rate		Gothenburg	Sweden	For Royal Swedish Navy.
Unknown date	Ay Bagçelı	Fourth rate			Ottoman Empire	For Ottoman Navy.
Unknown date	Devonshir	Fourth rate		Amsterdam	Dutch Republic	For Imperial Russian Navy.
Unknown date	Karlskrona Vapen	Sixth rate		Karlshamn	Sweden	For Royal Swedish Navy.
Unknown date	Leiden	Third rate	Jan van Rheenen	Amsterdam	Dutch Republic	For Dutch Navy.
Unknown date	Marlburg	Fourth rate		Amsterdam	Dutch Republic	For Imperial Russian Navy.
Unknown date	Portsmut	Fourth rate		Amsterdam	Dutch Republic	For Imperial Russian Navy.
Unknown date	Servi Bagçelı	Fourth rate			Ottoman Empire	For Ottoman Navy.
Unknown date	Yılan Başlı	Fifth rate			Ottoman Empire	For Ottoman Navy.
