= List of ship launches in 1717 =

The list of ship launches in 1717 includes a chronological list of some ships launched in 1717.

Date	Ship	Class	Builder	Location	Country	Notes
January	Nossa Senhora da Penha de França	Third rate		Lisbon	Kingdom of Portugal	For Portuguese Navy.
7 February	Gloria Venetia	Third rate	Zuanne di Francesco Venturini	Venice	Republic of Venice	For Venetian Navy.
28 February	Falcon	San Spiridon-class ship of the line	Giovanni Battista di Zorzi	Venice	Republic of Venice	For Venetian Navy.
28 February	San Zaccharia	San Spiridon-class ship of the line	Iseppo di Antonio Testarossa	Venice	Republic of Venice	For Venetian Navy.
14 March	Fortuna Guerriera	San Lorenzo Zustinian-class ship of the line	Antonia di Pieri Mazorini	Venice	Republic of Venice	For Venetian Navy.
March	Le Content	Fourth rate	Pierre-Blaise Coulomb	Lorient	Kingdom of France	For French Navy.
July	Addison	East Indiaman			Great Britain	For British East India Company.
9 August	San Spiridon	San Spiridon-class ship of the line	Zuanne Scabozzi	Venice	Republic of Venice	For Venetian Navy.
6 December	Idra	San Spiridon-class ship of the line	Francesco di Angelo de Ponti	Venice	Republic of Venice	For Venetian Navy.
Unknown date	Akçaşehir	Fourth rate			Ottoman Empire	For Ottoman Navy.
Unknown date	Chameau	Flûte	Blaise Ollivier	Rochefort	Kingdom of France	For French Navy.
Unknown date	Çifte Ceylan Kıçlı	Third rate			Ottoman Empire	For Ottoman Navy.
Unknown date	Çifte Teber Kıçlı	Fourth rate			Ottoman Empire	For Ottoman Navy.
Unknown date	Fulmine	Bomb vessel			Republic of Venice	For Venetian Navy.
Unknown date	Gelderland	Third rate	Jan van Rheenen	Amsterdam	Dutch Republic	For Dutch Navy.
Unknown date	Kırmızı Kuşaklı	Fourth rate			Ottoman Empire	For Ottoman Navy.
Unknown date	Kula At Başlı	Third rate			Ottoman Empire	For Ottoman Navy.
Unknown date	Kuş Bagçelı Karavele	Fifth rate			Ottoman Empire	For Ottoman Navy.
Unknown date	Caille	Caille-class gabarre	François Coulomb	Toulon	Kingdom of France	For French Navy.
Unknown date	Alouette	Caille-class gabarre	François Coulomb	Toulon	Kingdom of France	For French Navy.
Unknown date	Perdrix	Caille-class gabarre	François Coulomb	Toulon	Kingdom of France	For French Navy.
Unknown date	Madonna delle Grazie	Bomb vessel			Republic of Venice	For Venetian Navy.
Unknown date	Mavi Arslan Başlı	Fifth rate			Ottoman Empire	For Ottoman Navy.
Unknown date	Mavi Kıçlı Karavele	Fifth rate			Ottoman Empire	For Ottoman Navy.
Unknown date	Roosendaal	Third rate	Jan van Rheenen	Amsterdam	Dutch Republic	For Dutch Navy.
Unknown date	Sarı Kuşaklı	Fourth rate			Ottoman Empire	For Ottoman Navy.
Unknown date	Schoonenberg	East Indiaman		Amsterdam	Dutch Republic	For Dutch East India Company.
Unknown date	Siyah Arslan Kıçlı	Fourth rate			Ottoman Empire	For Ottoman Navy.
Unknown date	Taç Başlı	Fifth rate			Ottoman Empire	For Ottoman Navy.
Unknown date	Yaldızlı Hurma	Third rate			Ottoman Empire	For Ottoman Navy.
Unknown date	Yaldızlı Nar Kiçlı	Fourth rate			Ottoman Empire	For Ottoman Navy.
Unknown date	Yeşil Kuşaklı	Fourth rate			Ottoman Empire	For Ottoman Navy.
Unknown date	Yıldız Bagçeli	Fourth rate			Ottoman Empire	For Ottoman Navy.
Unknown date	Yaldızlı Kıçlı	Fourth rate			Ottoman Empire	For Ottoman Navy.
