= List of ship launches in 1732 =

The list of ship launches in 1732 includes a chronological list of some ships launched in 1732.

Date	Ship	Class	Builder	Location	Country	Notes
6 January	Centurion	Fourth rate		Portsmouth Dockyard	Great Britain	For Royal Navy.
6 January	Dolphin	Sixth rate	Richard Stacey	Deptford Dockyard	Great Britain	For Royal Navy.
16 July	Vakhmeister	Fifth rate	Richard Cozens	Saint Petersburg	Russia	For Imperial Russian Navy.
22 August	Deptford	Fourth rate		Deptford Dockyard	Great Britain	For Royal Navy.
24 August	Bonetta	Sloop-of-war	John Hayward	Deptford Dockyard	Great Britain	For Royal Navy.
25 August	Spy	Sloop-of-war	Benjamin Rosewell	Chatham Dockyard	Great Britain	For Royal Navy.
6 September	Cruizer	Sloop-of-war	Richard Stacey	Deptford Dockyard	Great Britain	For Royal Navy.
6 September	Hound	Sloop-of-war	Richard Stacey	Deptford Dockyard	Great Britain	For Royal Navy.
6 September	Trial	Sloop-of-war	Richard Stacey	Deptford Dockyard	Great Britain	For Royal Navy.
7 September	Saltash	Sloop-of-war	Peirson Lock	Plymouth Dockyard	Great Britain	For Royal Navy.
7 September	Shark	Sloop-of-war	Joseph Allin	Portsmouth Dockyard	Great Britain	For Royal Navy.
15 September	Fly	Sloop-of-war	John Ward	Sheerness Dockyard	Great Britain	For Royal Navy.
September	Sugur Chitzli	Third rate			Ottoman Empire	For Ottoman Navy.
6 October	Enigheten	Third rate	Charles Sheldon	Karlskrona	Sweden	For Royal Swedish Navy.
6 October	Swallow	Fourth rate	Peirson Lock	Devonport Dockyard	Great Britain	For Royal Navy.
December	Oldenborg	Fourth rate		location	Denmark–Norway	For Dano-Norwegian Navy.
Unknown date	Boekenrode	Fourth rate	Thomas Davis	Amsterdam	Dutch Republic	For Dutch Navy.
Unknown date	Markgrevinde Sophia Christina	Fourth rate		Arodsand Shipyard	Denmark–Norway	For Dano-Norwegian Navy.
Unknown date	Prince Frederick's Barge	State barge	John Hall	London	Great Britain	For Frederick, Prince of Wales.
Unknown date	Real Felipe	First rate	Ciprián Autrán	Guarnizo	Spain	For Spanish Navy.
Unknown date	Rossum	Fourth rate	Paulus van Zwijndrecht	Rotterdam	Dutch Republic	For Dutch Navy.
Unknown date	Starrenburg	Third rate		Rotterdam	Dutch Republic	For Dutch Navy.
