= List of ship launches in 1706 =

The list of ship launches in 1706 includes a chronological list of some ships launched in 1706.

Date	Ship	Class	Builder	Location	Country	Notes
9 January	Nassau	Third rate		Portsmouth Dockyard	England	For Royal Navy.
1 February	Saint Michel	Third rate	Gobert	Lorient	Kingdom of France	For French Navy.
6 March	Aldborough	Sixth rate		Blackwall	England	For Royal Navy.
23 March	Dauphine	Fourth rate	Philippe Cochois	Le Havre	Kingdom of France	For French Navy.
18 April	York	Fourth rate	Lock	Plymouth Dockyard	England	For Royal Navy.
April	Aist	Third rate	Y Kol		Russia	For Imperial Russian Navy.
26 June	Bourbon	Fourth rate		Lorient	Kingdom of France	For French Navy.
June	Lys	Ship of the line	Blaise Pangalo	Brest	Kingdom of France	For French Navy.
1 August	Elizabeth	Third rate	Stacey	Woolwich Dockyard	England	For Royal Navy.
1 August	Restoration	Third rate	Allin	Deptford Dockyard	England	For Royal Navy.
10 December	St Albans	Fourth rate	Burchett	Rotherhithe	England	For Royal Navy.
Unknown date	Island	Fourth rate			Denmark-Norway	For Dano-Norwegian Navy.
Unknown date	Grand	Third rate	Honoré Mallet	Rochefore	Kingdom of France	For French Navy.
Unknown date	Wenden	Third rate			Denmark-Norway	For Dano-Norwegian Navy.
