= List of ship launches in 1701 =

The list of ship launches in 1701 includes a chronological list of some ships launched in 1701.

Date	Ship	Class	Builder	Location	Country	Notes
14 March	Parfait	Third rate	François Coulomb	Toulon	Kingdom of France	For French Navy.
11 April	Fröken Eleonora	Sixth rate	Charles Sheldon	Karlskrona	(Sweden) Swedish Empire	For Royal Swedish Navy.
14 April	The Michael and Frances	Merchantman	Michael Elmes	St. Winnow	England	For private owner.
July	Royal Sovereign	First rate	Fisher Harding	Woolwich Dockyard	England	For Royal Navy.
18 October	Fendant	Fourth rate	Philippe Cochois	Le Havre	Kingdom of France	For French Navy.
28 November	Sage	Fourth rate	Pierre-Blaise Coulomb	Lorient	Kingdom of France	For French Navy.
Unknown date	Asia Merchant	Full-rigged ship			England	For British East India Company.
Unknown date	Havfruen	Third rate			Denmark-Norway	For Dano-Norwegian Navy.
Unknown date	Isle of Wight	Yacht	Elias Waffle	Portsmouth Dockyard	England	For Royal Navy.
Unknown date	Monck	Fourth rate	Robert Burchett	Portsmouth Dockyard	England	For Royal Navy.
Unknown date	Razzhyonnoe Zhelezo	Fifth rate	V Gerens	Voronezh	Russia	For Imperial Russian Navy.
Unknown date	Salamander	Bomb vessel	Rotterdam Naval Yard	Rotterdam	Dutch Republic	For Dutch Navy.
Unknown date	Sviatoi Georgii	Third rate			Russia	For Imperial Russian Navy.
Unknown date	Windhond	Sixth rate			Dutch Republic	For Dutch Navy.
