= List of ship launches in 1738 =

The list of ship launches in 1738 includes a chronological list of some ships launched in 1738.

Date	Ship	Class	Builder	Location	Country	Notes
3 June	Le Duc de Chartres	East Indiaman	Gilles Cambry	Lorient	Kingdom of France	For French East India Company.
9 June	Diligente	Diligente-class tartane	Louis Marchand	Toulon	Kingdom of France	For French Navy.
27 June	Superbe	Third rate	Laurent Helie	Brest	Kingdom of France	For French Navy.
13 October	Dauphin Royal	Third rate		Brest	Kingdom of France	For French Navy.
3 September	Dronningen af Danmark	Chinaman		Copenhagen	Denmark-Norway	For Danish Asiatic Company
25 October	Gaillarde	Diligente-class tartane	Louis Marchand	Toulon	Kingdom of France	For French Navy.
27 December	Dannebrog	Third rate		Copenhagen	Denmark-Norway	For Dano-Norwegian Navy.
27 December	Jylland	Third rate		Copenhagen	Denmark-Norway	For Dano-Norwegian Navy.
Unknown date	Åskedunder	Bomb vessel	Daniel Friese	Karlskrona	Sweden	For Royal Swedish Navy.
Unknown date	Concepcion	Sixth rate		El Realejo	(Spain) Captaincy General of Guatemala	For Spanish Navy.
Unknown date	Galera Soranzo	Galley			Republic of Venice	For Venetian Navy.
Unknown date	Madonna del Carmine e San Francesco di Paola	Full-rigged ship		location	Republic of Venice	For private owner.
Unknown date	Prince William	East Indiaman			Great Britain	For British East India Company.
Unknown date	Resource	Grab		Bombay	India	For British East India Company.
Unknown date	Ulriksdal	Sixth rate	Daniel Friese	Skeppsholmen	Sweden	For Royal Swedish Navy.
