= List of ship launches in 1696 =

The list of ship launches in 1696 includes a chronological list of some ships launched in 1696.

Date	Ship	Class	Builder	Location	Country	Notes
January	Bellone	Fifth rate frégate à deux batteries		Brest	Kingdom of France	For French Navy.
January	Couronne	Fleur de Lis-class galley	Simon Chabert	Marseille	Kingdom of France	For French Navy.
January	Superbe	Fleur de Lis-class galley	Simon Chabert	Marseille	Kingdom of France	For French Navy.
15 February	Foudroyante	Fourth rate bomb vessel		Lorient	Kingdom of France	For French Navy.
February	Admiral Lefort	Sea of Azov-class galley		Voronezh	Russia	For Imperial Russian Navy.
February	Captain Bruce	Galley		Voronezh	Russia	For Imperial Russian Navy (captain Y V Bruce).
February	Captain Bruce	Galley		Voronezh	Russia	For Imperial Russian Navy (captain R Bruce).
February	Captain Bulart	Galley		Voronezh	Russia	For Imperial Russian Navy.
February	Captain Bykovskiy	Galley		Voronezh	Russia	For Imperial Russian Navy.
February	Captain Cunningham	Galley		Voronezh	Russia	For Imperial Russian Navy.
February	Captain Gasenius	Galley		Voronezh	Russia	For Imperial Russian Navy.
February	Captain Grott	Galley		Voronezh	Russia	For Imperial Russian Navy.
February	Captain Hotunskiy	Galley		Voronezh	Russia	For Imperial Russian Navy.
February	Captain Inglis	Galley		Voronezh	Russia	For Imperial Russian Navy.
February	Captain Kotunskiy	Galley		Voronezh	Russia	For Imperial Russian Navy.
February	Captain Oleshev	Galley		Voronezh	Russia	For Imperial Russian Navy.
February	Captain Prince Repmin	Galley		Voronezh	Russia	For Imperial Russian Navy.
February	Captain Schmidt	Galley		Voronezh	Russia	For Imperial Russian Navy.
February	Captain Prince Trubstkoy	Galley		Voronezh	Russia	For Imperial Russian Navy.
February	Captain Pristav	Galley		Voronezh	Russia	For Imperial Russian Navy.
February	Captain Turlavil	Galley		Voronezh	Russia	For Imperial Russian Navy.
February	Captain Ushakov	Galley		Voronezh	Russia	For Imperial Russian Navy.
February	Captain Veyde	Galley		Voronezh	Russia	For Imperial Russian Navy.
February	Principum	Galley		Voronezh	Russia	For Imperial Russian Navy.
February	Shoutbenakht de Lozier	Sea of Azov-class galley		Voronezh	Russia	For Imperial Russian Navy.
February	Vice-Admiral Lima	Galley		Voronezh	Russia	For Imperial Russian Navy.
4 March	Aurora	San Lorenzo Zustinian-class ship of the line	Giacomo de Zorzi Grando	Venice	Republic of Venice	For Venetian Navy.
24 March	Scarborough	Fifth rate frigate	James Parker	Southampton	England	For Royal Navy.
26 March	Tigre	San Lorenzo Zustinian-class ship of the line	Iseppo De Pieri di Zuanne	Venice	Republic of Venice	For Venetian Navy.
26 April	Apostol Piotr	Fifth rate rowing frigate	A Meyer	Voronezh	Russia	For Imperial Russian Navy.
28 April	Sviatoi Pavel	Fifth rate rowing frigate	A Meyer	Voronezh	Russia	For Imperial Russian Navy.
26 May	Sol d'Oro	San Lorenzo Zustinian-class ship of the line	Iseppo di Antonio Testarossa	Venice	Republic of Venice	For Venetian Navy.
29 May	Giove	San Lorenzo Zustinian-class ship of the line	Zuanne di Francesco Piccolo de Venezia	Venice	Republic of Venice	For Venetian Navy.
6 July	Blackwall	Fourth rate	Henry Johnson	Blackwall Yard	England	For Royal Navy.
22 December	Aquila Reale	Fifth rate			Republic of Venice	For Venetian Navy.
Unknown date	Blikkenburg	Unrated ship	Hendrik Kakelaar	Veere	Dutch Republic	For Dutch Navy.
Unknown date	Concordia	East Indiaman	Dutch East India Company	Delfshaven	Dutch Republic	For Dutch East India Company.
Unknown date	Doniawerstal	Sixth rate frigate		Harlingen	Dutch Republic	For Dutch Navy.
Unknown date	Galei	Full-rigged ship		Zeeland	Dutch Republic	For Dutch Navy.
Unknown date	Intelligence	Brigantine	Joseph Lawrence	Woolwich Dockyard	England	For Royal Navy.
Unknown date	Neerrijnen	Sixth rate frigate		Harlingen	Dutch Republic	For Dutch Navy.
Unknown date	Nonsuch	Fourth rate	Castle	Deptford	England	For Royal Navy.
Unknown date	Overijssel	Fourth rate	Hendrik Cardinaal	Amsterdam	Dutch Republic	For Dutch Navy.
Unknown date	Postboy	Brigantine	Fisher Harding	Deptford Dockyard	England	For Royal Navy.
Unknown date	Prins Carl	Fourth rate		Copenhagen	Denmark	For Dano-Norwegian Navy.
Unknown date	Raaf	Fourth rate	Hendrik Cardinaal	Amsterdam	Dutch Republic	For Dutch Navy.
Unknown date	Rozenburg	Sixth rate		Zeeland	Dutch Republic	For Dutch Navy.
Unknown date	Wapen van Medemblik	Fourth rate			Dutch Republic	For Dutch Navy.
Unknown date	Warwick	Fourth rate	Castle	Deptford	England	For Royal Navy.
Unknown date	Wulverhorst	Fourth rate		Amsterdam	Dutch Republic	For Dutch Navy.
