= List of ship launches in 2026 =

This is a chronological list of some ships launched in 2026.

Date	Ship	Class / type	Builder	Location	Country	Notes
March	Viking Libra	Cruise ship	Fincantieri	Italy	Ancona	For Viking Ocean Cruises
September	Viking Astrea	Cruise ship	Fincantieri	Italy	Ancona	For Viking Ocean Cruises
September	Modularis	research vessel	Flensburger Schiffbau Gesellschaft	Germany	Flensburg	
November	Good Shepherd V	Ferry	Parkol Marine Engineering	Shetland Islands	Scotland	
