= List of ship launches in 1688 =

The list of ship launches in 1688 includes a chronological list of some ships launched in 1688.

Date	Ship	Class	Builder	Location	Country	Notes
11 February	Monton d'Oro	Fifth rate armed storeship	Iseppo di Piero de Pieri	Venice	Republic of Venice	For Venetian Navy.
12 February	Abbondanza e Ricchezza	Fifth rate armed storeship	Antonio Filetto	Venice	Republic of Venice	For Venetian Navy.
22 June	Trident	Third rate	Laurent Coulomb	Toulon	Kingdom of France	For French Navy.
26 June	Éclatant	Third rate		Marseille	Kingdom of France	For French Navy.
10 August	Conquérant	Second rate	Blaise Pangelo	Toulon	Kingdom of France	For French Navy.
18 August	Henri	Third rate	Houwens Hendrik	Dunkerque	Kingdom of France	For French Navy.
August	Maure	Third rate	Blaise Pangalo	Toulon	Kingdom of France	For French Navy.
Unknown date	Amsterdam	Third rate	Jan van Rheenen, Amsterdam Naval Yard	Amsterdam	Dutch Republic	For Dutch Republic Navy.
Unknown date	Anna	Fifth rate	Jan van Rheenen, Amsterdam Naval Yard	Amsterdam	Dutch Republic	For Dutch Republic Navy.
Unknown date	Benjamin	East Indiaman		London	England	For British East India Company.
Unknown date	Brielle	Fifth rate	Jan Salomonszoon van den Tempel	Rotterdam	Dutch Republic	For Dutch Republic Navy.
Unknown date	Favourite	Unrated galley		Marseille	Kingdom of France	For French Navy.
Unknown date	Firedrake	Bomb vessel	Fisher Harding, Deptford Dockyard	Deptford	England	For Royal Navy.
Unknown date	Gaesterland	Fourth rate	Hendrik Cardinaal, Amsterdam Naval Yard	Amsterdam	Dutch Republic	For Dutch Republic Navy.
Unknown date	Haarlem	Third rate	Jan van Rheenen	Amsterdam	Dutch Republic	For Dutch Republic Navy.
Unknown date	Héroine	Unrated galley		Marseille	Kingdom of France	For French Navy.
Unknown date	Hollandia	Fourth rate			Dutch Republic	For Dutch Republic Navy.
Unknown date	Kasteel van Medemblik	Second rate			Dutch Republic	For Dutch Republic Navy.
Unknown date	Keurvorst van Brandenburg	First rate	Hendrik Cardinaal, Amsterdam Naval Yard	Amsterdam	Dutch Republic	For Dutch Republic Navy.
Unknown date	La Sorcière	Privateer frigate		Dunkerque	Kingdom of France	For private owner.
Unknown date	Maagd van Enkhuizen	Third rate		Enkhuizen	Dutch Republic	For Dutch Republic Navy.
Unknown date	Oldenborg	Fourth rate	Christiana	Copenhagen	Denmark	For Dano-Norwegian Navy.
Unknown date	Prins Willem	First rate	Hendrik Cardinaal, Amsterdam Naval Yard	Amsterdam	Dutch Republic	For Dutch Republic Navy.
Unknown date	Raadhuis van Edam	Fourth rate			Dutch Republic	For Dutch Republic Navy.
Unknown date	St. Anna	Merchantman		Deptford	England	For private owner.
Unknown date	Veluwe	Third rate	Jan Salomonszoon van den Tempel	Rotterdam	Dutch Republic	For Dutch Republic Navy.
Unknown date	Vlaardingen	Fourth rate			Dutch Republic	For Dutch Republic Navy.
Unknown date	Vlissingen	Fourth rate	Adriaan Janszoon de Vriend	Vlissingen	Dutch Republic	For Dutch Republic Navy.
Unknown date	Zierikzee	Third rate	Adriaan Janszoon de Vriend	Vlissingen	Dutch Republic	For Dutch Republic Navy.
Unknown date	Zomer	Fifth rate		Zeeland	Dutch Republic	For Dutch Republic Navy.
Unknown date	Zwolle	Fifth rate	Jan van Rheenen	Amsterdam	Dutch Republic	For Dutch Republic Navy.
