= List of ship launches in 1735 =

The list of ship launches in 1735 includes a chronological list of some ships launched in 1735.

Date	Ship	Class	Builder	Location	Country	Notes
29 March	Alderney	Bomb vessel	John Hayward	Woolwich Dockyard	Great Britain	For Royal Navy.
29 April	Deptford	Storeship	John Stacey	Deptford Dockyard	Great Britain	For Royal Navy.
11 June	Defence	East Indiaman	Thomas Bronsdon	Deptford	Great Britain	For British East India Company.
28 June	Finland	Fourth rate	Johan Falck	Stockholm	Sweden	For Royal Swedish Navy.
24 July	Strafford	Fourth rate	John Ward	Chatham Dockyard	Great Britain	For Royal Navy.
19 August	Nossa Senhora da Vitória	Fourth rate		Lisbon	Kingdom of Portugal	For Portuguese Navy.
18 November	Nossa Senhora da Esperança	Fourth rate		Lisbon	Kingdom of Portugal	For Portuguese Navy.
20 December	Worcester	Fourth rate	Joseph Allin	Portsmouth Dockyard	Great Britain	For Royal Navy.
Unknown date	Beschermer	Fourth rate	Charles Bentam	Amsterdam	Dutch Republic	For Dutch Navy.
Unknown date	Çifte Bagçeli	Third rate		Sinop	Ottoman Empire	For Ottoman Navy.
Unknown date	Delmenhorst	Fourth rate			Denmark–Norway	For Dano-Norwegian Navy.
Unknown date	Ejder Başlı	Third rate		Sinop	Ottoman Empire	For Ottoman Navy.
Unknown date	Galera Civran	Galley			Republic of Venice	For Venetian Navy.
Unknown date	Galera Magno	Galley			Republic of Venice	For Venetian Navy.
Unknown date	Galera Sagredo	Galley			Republic of Venice	For Venetian Navy.
Unknown date	Neheng-ı Bahri	Third rate			Ottoman Empire	For Ottoman Navy.
Unknown date	Norske Løve	Third rate			Denmark–Norway	For Dano-Norwegian Navy.
Unknown date	Şehbaz-ı Bahri	Fourth rate			Ottoman Empire	For Ottoman Navy.
Unknown date	Spion	Corvette	Charles Bentam	Amsterdam	Dutch Republic	For Dutch Navy.
Unknown date	Teilingen	Fourth rate	Charles Bentham	Amsterdam	Dutch Republic	For Dutch Navy.
Unknown date	Vautour	Corvette		Lorient	Kingdom of France	For French Navy.
