= List of ship launches in the 15th century =

This list of ship launches in the 15th century includes a chronological list of some ships launched from 1400 to 1499.

	Ship	Class / type	Builder	Location	Country	Notes
1418	Grace Dieu	Flagship	William Soper	Southampton	England	For Henry V of England
1441	Pinta	Caravela latina			Castile	Part of Columbus' first expedition
~1449	Newport Medieval Ship	Great ship		Newport	England	Launch date approximate
Before 1486	Gribshunden	Flagship			Denmark	For John, King of Denmark
Before 1492	Niña	Caravela latina			Castile	Part of Columbus' first expedition
Before 1492	Santa María	Nau carrack			Castile	Flagship of Columbus' first expedition
1497	São Gabriel	Carrack	Bartolomeu Dias		Portugal	Flagship of Vasco da Gama's expedition to India
Unknown date	Peter van Rosseel	Carrack		Danzig	Hanseatic League	
Unknown date	Santa Clara	Carrack			Castile	For Castilian Navy
