= List of ship launches in 1720 =

The list of ship launches in 1720 includes a chronological list of some ships launched in 1720.

Date	Ship	Class	Builder	Location	Country	Notes
13 February	Blandford	Sixth rate	Richard Stacey	Deptford Dockyard	Great Britain	For Royal Navy.
July	Sceptre	Sceptre-class ship of the line	Etienne Hubac	Brest	Kingdom of France	For French Navy.
September	Bourbon	Sceptre-class ship of the line	Laurent Helie	Brest	Kingdom of France	For French Navy.
October	Aislabie	East Indiaman	Thomas Bronsdon	Deptford	Great Britain	For British East India Company.
Unknown date	Le Vainqueur	Frigate			Kingdom of France	For private owner.
