= List of ship launches in 1660 =

The list of ship launches in 1660 includes a chronological list of some ships launched in 1660.

Date	Ship	Class	Builder	Location	Country	Notes
27 August	HMS Princess	Fourth-rate frigate	Daniel Furzer	Lydney	England	For Royal Navy.
