= List of ship launches in 1727 =

The list of ship launches in 1727 includes a chronological list of some ships launched in 1727.

Date	Ship	Class	Builder	Location	Country	Notes
6 April	Deal Castle	Fourth rate	John Ward	Sheerness Dockyard	Great Britain	For Royal Navy.
12 April	Squirrel	Sixth rate	Richard Stracey	Woolwich Dockyard	Great Britain	For Royal Navy.
21 June	Nossa Senhora de Alampadola	Man of War		Lisbon	Portugal	For Portuguese Navy.
27 June	Samson	Bomb vessel	Richard Cozens	Saint Petersburg	Russia	For Imperial Russian Navy.
21 September	Etna	Bomb vessel			Russia	For Imperial Russian Navy.
6 October	Rye	Sixth rate	Benjamin Rosewell	Chatham Dockyard	Great Britain	For Royal Navy.
21 October	Aldborough	Sixth rate	Joseph Allin	Portsmouth Dockyard	Great Britain	For Royal Navy.
Unknown date	Méduse	Corvette		Le Havre	Kingdom of France	For French Navy.
29 November	Léopard	Third rate	Joseph-Marie-Blaise Coulombe	Toulon	Kingdom of France	For French Navy.
Unknown date	Epervier	Epervier-class brig		Marseille	Kingdom of France	For French Navy.
Unknown date	Vautour	Epervier-class brig		Marseille	Kingdom of France	For French Navy.
Unknown date	Sophia Magdalena	Second rate			Denmark-Norway	For Dano-Norwegian Navy.
