= List of ship launches in 1670 =

The list of ship launches in 1670 includes a chronological list of some ships launched in 1670.

Date	Ship	Class	Builder	Location	Country	Notes
11 February	Sceptre	Second rate	Laurent Coulomb	Toulon	Kingdom of France	For French Navy.
28 February	Madame	Second rate	Jean Guérouard	Toulon	Kingdom of France	For French Navy.
4 March	Royale Thérèse	Second rate	Rodolphe Gédéon	Toulon	Kingdom of France	For French Navy.
March	Brave	Third rate		Rochefort	Kingdom of France	For French Navy.
29 April	Louvre	Walloon-class ship of the line	Laurent Hubac	Brest	Kingdom of France	For French Navy.
25 July	London	First rate	Christopher Pett and Jonas Shish, Deptford Dockyard	Deptford	England	For Royal Navy.
August	Tourbillon	Fifth rate		Brest	Kingdom of France	For French Navy.
19 September	Terrible	Second rate	Laurent Hubac	Brest	Kingdom of France	For French Navy.
19 September	Tonnant	Third rate	Laurent Hubac	Brest	Kingdom of France	For French Navy.
2 October	Joli	Joli-class ship of the line	Rodolphe Gédéon	Toulon	Kingdom of France	For French Navy.
4 October	Alsace	Third rate	Noel Pomet	Rochefort	Kingdom of France	For French Navy.
4 October	St Andrew	First rate	Christopher Pett, Woolwich Dockyard	Woolwich	England	For Royal Navy.
15 October	Rubis	Joli-class ship of the line	Rodolphe Gédéon	Toulon	Kingdom of France	For French Navy.
22 November	Navarrais	Fourth rate	François Pomet	Rochefort	Kingdom of France	For French Navy.
November	Oriflamme	Third rate	Laurent Hubac	Brest	Kingdom of France	For French Navy.
3 December	Prince	First rate	Phineas Pett, Deptford Dockyard	Deptford	England	For Royal Navy.
December	Constant	Assuré-class frigate	Hendrick Howens	Dunkerque	Kingdom of France	For French Navy.
December	Assuré	Assuré-class frigate	Hendrik Howens	Dunkerque	Kingdom of France	For French Navy.
Unknown date	Falken	Fourth rate		Stockholm	Sweden	For Royal Swedish Navy.
Unknown date	Friponne	Fifth rate	Honoré Mallet	Rochefort	Kingdom of France	For French Navy.
Unknown date	Noord Holland	Fourth rate			Dutch Republic	For Dutch Republic Navy.
Unknown date	Nordstjärnen	Fifth rate frigate	Medelpad	Norrland	Sweden	For Royal Swedish Navy.
Unknown date	Rotterdam	Fourth rate		Rotterdam	Dutch Republic	For Dutch Republic Navy.
Unknown date	Saudadoes	Royal yacht			England	For King Charles II.
Unknown date	Zeelandia	Fourth rate		Rotterdam	Dutch Republic	For Dutch Republic Navy.
