= List of ship launches in 1723 =

The list of ship launches in 1723 includes a chronological list of some ships launched in 1723.

Date	Ship	Class	Builder	Location	Country	Notes
January	Parfaite	Argonaute-class ship of the line		Brest	Kingdom of France	For French Navy.
January	Saint Louis	Ardent-class ship of the line	Joseph-Louis Oliver	Rochefort	Kingdom of France	For French Navy.
13 March	Spence	Sloop of War	Richard Stacey	Deptford Dockyard	Great Britain	For Royal Navy.
17 March	Phénix	Duc d'Orleans-class ship of the line	Rene Levasseur	Toulon	Kingdom of France	For French Navy.
26 May	Sankt Mikhail	Sankt Mikhail-class ship of the line	Richard Brown	Saint Petersburg	Russian Empire	For Imperial Russian Navy.
23 July	Berwick	Third rate		Deptford Dockyard	Great Britain	For Royal Navy.
28 September	Favoritka	Snow	G A Menshikov	Saint Petersburg	Russian Empire	For Imperial Russian Navy.
2 October	Gran Princes de los Cielos	Third rate			Spain	For Spanish Navy.
October	Vénus	Fifth rate	Jacques Portier	Le Havre	Kingdom of France	For French Navy.
11 November	Ferme	Duc d'Orleans-class ship of the line	Rene Levasseur	Toulon	Kingdom of France	For French Navy.
November	Neptune	Third rate	Laurnet Helie	Brest	Kingdom of France	For French Navy.
December	San Andrea	Fifth rate	Andrea Gallina	Venice	Republic of Venice	For Venetian Navy.
Unknown date	Ardent	Ardent-class ship of the line	Blaise Geslain	Rochefort	Kingdom of France	For French Navy.
Unknown date	Damiaten	Fourth rate	Gerbrand Slegt	Amsterdam	Dutch Republic	For Dutch Navy.
Unknown date	Duchesse	France-class galley	Jean Reynoir	Marseille	Kingdom of France	For French Navy.
Unknown date	Ferme	Ferme-class galley	Pierre Chabert	Marseille	Kingdom of France	For French Navy.
Unknown date	France	France-class galley	Jean Reynoir	Marseille	Kingdom of France	For French Navy.
Unknown date	Hardie	Ferme-class galley	Pierre Chabert	Marseille	Kingdom of France	For French Navy.
Unknown date	Sandenburg	Fourth rate			Dutch Republic	For Dutch Navy.
Unknown date	Tholen	Third rate	Hendrik Raas	Vlissingen	Dutch Republic	For Dutch Navy.
