= List of ship launches in 1704 =

The list of ship launches in 1704 includes a chronological list of some ships launched in 1704.

| Date | Ship | Class | Builder | Location | Country | Notes |
|---|---|---|---|---|---|---|
| 15 January | Oriflamme | Fourth rate | | Toulon | Kingdom of France | For French Navy. |
| 21 January | Rubis | Third rate | Pierre-Blaise Coulomb | Lorient | Kingdom of France | For French Navy. |
| January | Fidèle | Third rate | Philippe Cochois | Le Havre | Kingdom of France | For French Navy. |
| 10 March | Newcastle | Fourth rate | Sir J Allin | Sheerness Dockyard | England | For Royal Navy. |
| 18 March | Reserve | Fourth rate | Harding | Deptford Dockyard | England | For Royal Navy. |
| 5 April | Roebuck | Fifth rate | Thomas Podd | Portsmouth Dockyard | England | For Royal Navy. |
| 2 May | Jason | Third rate | Blaise Pengalo | Brest | Kingdom of France | For French Navy. |
| 3 May | Auguste | Fourth rate | Etienne Hubac | Brest | Kingdom of France | For French Navy. |
| 12 May | Mary | Fourth rate | Shortis | Chatham Dockyard | England | For Royal Navy. |
| 9 June | Plymouth | Transport ship | Benjamin Rosewell | Plymouth Dockyard | England | For Royal Navy. |
| 18 July | Degas | Sant Iakim-class snow | Y Rulovs | Olonetsk | Russia | For Imperial Russian Navy. |
| 18 July | Kopore | Sant Iakim-class snow | V Graf | Olonetsk | Russia | For Imperial Russian Navy. |
| 20 July | Iamburg | Sant Iakim-class snow | V Graf | Olonetsk | Russia | For Imperial Russian Navy. |
| 27 August | Neptune | Third rate | François Coulomb | Toulon | Kingdom of France | For French Navy. |
| 6 September | Blenheim | East Indiaman | John Winter | Deptford | England | For British East India Company. |
| 24 September | | Sant Iakim-class snow | I Nemtsov | Olonetsk | Russia | For Imperial Russian Navy. |
| September | Victoire | Frégate légère | Jean-Armand Levasseur | Dunkirk | Kingdom of France | For French Navy. |
| September | Fortuné | Fifth rate | Jean-Armand Levasseur | Dunkirk | Kingdom of France | For French Navy. |
| November | Devonshire | Third rate | Robert Lee | Woolwich Dockyard | England | For Royal Navy. |
| Unknown date | Curacao | Fourth rate | | Amsterdam | Dutch Republic | For Dutch navy. |
| Unknown date | Ferret | Sloop of war | Edward Dummer | Blackwall | Kingdom of England | For Royal Navy. |
| Unknowndate | Valeur | Sixth rate | | Brest | Kingdom of France | For French Navy. |
| Unknown date | Matenes | Fourth rate | Pieter van Zwijndrecht | location | Dutch Republic | For Dutch Navy. |
| Unknown date | Oosterwijk | fourth rate | Jan van Rheenen | Amsterdam | Dutch Republic | For Dutch Navy. |
| Unknown date | Sant Iakin | Sant Iakim-class snow | V Rulos | Olonetsk | Russia | For Imperial Russian Navy. |
| Unknown date | Samson | Third rate | P Bas | Voronezh | Russia | For Imperial Russian Navy. |
| Unknown date | Swift | Sloop of war | William Lee | Woolwich Dockyard | England | For Royal Navy. |
| Unknown date | Weazle | Sloop of war | Edward Dummer | Blackwall | England | For Royal Navy. |
