= List of ship launches in 1707 =

The list of ship launches in 1707 includes a chronological list of some ships launched in 1707.

Date	Ship	Class	Builder	Location	Country	Notes
29 January	Flamborough	Flamborough-class sixth rate	Richard Stacey	Woolwich Dockyard	Great Britain	For Royal Navy.
13 February	Colchester	Fourth rate	Allin	Deptford Dockyard	Great Britain	For Royal Navy.
18 April	Gloire	Fifth rate	Laurent Helie	Lorient	Kingdom of France	For French Navy.
3 May	Astrée	Fifth rate	Blaise Pangalo	Brest	Kingdom of France	For French Navy.
3 July	Salisbury	Fourth rate	Rosewell	Chatham Dockyard	Great Britain	For Royal Navy.
August	Pompeux	Third rate	Pierre Masson	Rochefort	Kingdom of France	For French Navy.
21 September	Auguste	Third rate	René Levasseur	Dunkirk	Kingdom of France	For French Navy.
22 November	Truelove	Hoy	Thomas Podd	Portsmouth Dockyard	Great Britain	For Royal Navy.
November	Valeur	Fourth rate		Bayonne	Kingdom of France	For French Navy.
29 December	Squirrel	Flamborough-class sixth rate	Richard Stacey	Woolwich Dockyard	Great Britain	For Royal Navy.
Unknown date	Delmenhorst	Fourth rate	Judichaer		Denmark-Norway	For Dano-Norwegian Navy.
Unknown date	Duc du Maine	Fregat		Saint-Malo	Kingdom of France	
Unknown date	Groote Heeresveld	Third rate		Rotterdam	Dutch Republic	For Dutch Navy.
Unknown date	Justitia	Second rate	Judichaer	Nyholm, Copenhagen	Denmark-Norway	For Dano-Norwegian Navy.
Unknown date	Maas	Third rate	Pieter van Zwijndrecht	Rotterdam	Dutch Republic	For Dutch Navy.
Unknown date	Vollenhoven	Sixth rate	Paulus van Zwijndrecht	Rotterdam	Dutch Republic	For Dutch Navy.
