= List of ship launches in 1671 =

The list of ship launches in 1671 includes a chronological list of some ships launched in 1671.

Date	Ship	Class	Builder	Location	Country	Notes
1 January	Basque	Fourth rate	Joseph Saboulin	Bayonne	Kingdom of France	For French Navy.
31 March	Phoenix	Fifth rate	Anthony Deane, Portsmouth Dockyard	Portsmouth	England	For Royal Navy.
31 March	Royal James	First rate	Anthony Deane, Portsmouth Dockyard	Portsmouth	England	For Royal Navy.
25 May	Anjou	Third rate	Laurent Hubac	Brest	Kingdom of France	For French Navy.
25 May	Ardent	Fourth rate	Laurent Hubert	Brest	Kingdom of France	For French Navy.
14 June	Glorieux	Third rate	Laurent Coulomb	Toulon	Kingdom of France	For French Navy.
21 June	Fidèle	Third rate	Laurent Coulomb	Toulon	Kingdom of France	For French Navy.
June	Périlleux	Fifth rate frigate	Laurent Hubac	Brest	Kingdom of France	For French Navy.
June	Émerillon	Third rate	Jean-Pierre Brun	Rochefort	Kingdom of France	For French Navy.
June	Vermandois	Second rate	François Pomet	Rochefort	Kingdom of France	For French Navy.
6 July	Furieux	Fourth rate	Rodolphe Gédéon	Toulon	Kingdom of France	For French Navy.
20 July	Parfait	Third rate	François Chapelle	Toulon	Kingdom of France	For French Navy.
July	Arrogant	Fifth rate frigate	Laurent Hubac	Brest	Kingdom of France	For French Navy.
July	Intrépide	Third rate	Honoré Mallet	Rochefort	Kingdom of France	For French Navy.
15 August	Fougueux	Third rate	Jean Guérourard	Toulon	Kingdom of France	For French Navy.
August	Apollon	Third rate	François Pomet	Rochefort	Kingdom of France	For French Navy.
3 October	Heureux	Fourth rate	Jacques Tortel	Le Havre	Kingdom of France	For French Navy.
18 November	Anne	Yacht	Portsmouth Dockyard	Portsmouth	England	For Royal Navy.
November	Aventurier	Fifth rate frigate		Marseille	Kingdom of France	For French Navy.
15 December	Précieux	Fourth rate	Jacques Tortel	Le Havre	Kingdom of France	For French Navy.
Unknown date	Galei	full-rigged ship		Dunkerque	Kingdom of France	For Dutch Republic Navy.
Unknown date	Haas	Sixth rate		Dunkerque	Kingdom of France	For Dutch Republic Navy.
Unknown date	Ferme	Barque		Brest	Kingdom of France	For French Navy.
Unknown date	Fidèle	Barque		Dunkerque	Kingdom of France	For French Navy.
Unknown date	Inconnue	Barque		Dunkerque	Kingdom of France	For French Navy.
Unknown date	Daniau	Fireship			Kingdom of France	For French Navy.
Unknown date	Queenborough	Yacht	Phineus Pett, Chatham Dockyard	Chatham	England	For Royal Navy.
