= List of ship launches in 1718 =

The list of ship launches in 1718 includes a chronological list of ships launched in 1718.

Date	Ship	Class	Builder	Location	Country	Notes
23 March	Royal George	Full-rigged ship		Limehouse	Great Britain	For South Company.
6 May	San Pietro di Alcantara	Fourth rate	Zuanne di Francesco Venturini	Venice	Republic of Venice	For Venetian Navy.
14 May	Cigno	San Spiridon-class ship of the line	Antonio di Piero Manzorini	Venice	Republic of Venice	For Venetian Navy.
October	Vansittart	East Indiaman		River Thames	Great Britain	For British East India Company.
Unknown date	Cambi	Third rate		Barcelona	Spain	For Spanish Navy.
Unknown date	Lesnoe	Second rate	Admiralty Shipyard	Saint Petersburg	Russia	For Imperial Russian Navy (Лесное).
