= List of ship launches in 1664 =

The list of ship launches in 1664 includes a chronological list of some ships launched in 1664.

Date	Ship	Class	Builder	Location	Country	Notes
26 October	Royal Katherine	Second-rate ship of the line	Christopher Pett	Woolwich Dockyard	England	For Royal Navy.
November	Rubis	Ship of the line	Laurent Hubac	Brest Dockyard	Kingdom of France	For French Navy.
Unknown	Royal Oak	First-rate ship of the line	John Tippetts	Portsmouth Dockyard	England	For Royal Navy.
