= List of ship launches in 1678 =

The list of ship launches in 1678 includes a chronological list of some ships launched in 1678.

Date	Ship	Class	Builder	Location	Country	Notes
29 January	Ferme	Fourth rate frigate	François Chapelle	Toulon	Kingdom of France	For French Navy.
3 March	Elizabeth	Third rate	Castle	Deptford	England	For Royal Navy.
31 March	Arc en Ciel	Fourth rate frigate	François Chapelle	Toulon	Kingdom of France	For French Navy.
18 April	Lenox	Third rate	John Shish, Deptford Dockyard	Deptford	England	For Royal Navy.
December	Pace e Abbondanza	Sant'Antonio de Padova-class ship of the line		Venice	Republic of Venice	For Venetian Navy.
Unknown date	Anne	Third rate	Phineas Pett, Chatham Dockyard	Chatham	England	For Royal Navy.
Unknown date	Captain	Third rate	Thomas Shish, Deptford Dockyard	Deptford	England	For Royal Navy.
Unknown date	Gorinchem	Fourth rate	Salomon Janszoon van den Tempel	Rotterdam	Dutch Republic	For Dutch Republic Navy.
Unknown date	Hampton Court	Third rate	Thomas Shish, Deptford Dockyard	Deptford	England	For Royal Navy.
Unknown date	Hope	Third rate	Castle, Deptford Dockyard	Deptford	England	For Royal Navy.
Unknown date	Admirable	Second rate	Laurent Hubac	Brest	Kingdom of France	For French Navy.
Unknown date	Le Mars	Frigate			Kingdom of France	For Joseph van Acker (privateer).
Unknown date	Restoration	Third rate	J Betts	Harwich	England	For Royal Navy.
Unknown date	Rotterdam	Fourth rate	Salomon Janszoon van den Tempel	Rotterdam	Dutch Republic	For Dutch Republic Navy.
Unknown date	Vanguard	Second rate	Daniel Furzer, Portsmouth Dockyard	Portsmouth	England	For Royal Navy.
