= List of ship launches in 1681 =

The list of ship launches in 1681 includes a chronological list of some ships launched in 1681.

| Date | Ship | Class | Builder | Location | Country | Notes |
|---|---|---|---|---|---|---|
| 8 June | Amoy Merchant | East Indiaman | Henry Johnson, Blackwall Yard | Blackwall | England | For British East India Company. |
| August | Tonnant | Second rate | Laurent Hubac | Brest | Kingdom of France | For French Navy. |
| Unknown date | Mordaunt | Armed full-rigged ship, equivalent to a frigate | William Castle | Deptford | England | For Charles Mordaunt. |
| Unknown date | San Giacomo | Third rate | | Genoa | Republic of Genoa | For Genoese Navy. |
| Unknown date | Vrede | Fourth rate | | | Dutch Republic | For Dutch Republic Navy. |
| Unknown date | Wachtmeister | Fourth rate | Francis Sheldon | Riga | Sweden | For Royal Swedish Navy. |
