= List of ship launches in 1676 =

The list of ship launches in 1676 includes a chronological list of some ships launched in 1676.

Date	Ship	Class	Builder	Location	Country	Notes
January	Kingfisher	Fourth rate	Phineas Pett, Woolwich Dockyard	Woolwich	England	For Royal Navy.
21 August	Venere Armata	Drago Allungati-class ship of the line	Iseppo Depien di Zuanne	Venice	Republic of Venice	For Venetian Navy.
Unknown date	Bengal Merchant	East Indiaman		Deptford	England	For British East India Company.
Unknown date	Charles Galley	Fifth rate	Woolwich Dockyard	Woolwich	England	For Royal Navy.
Unknown date	Eendracht	Sixth rate		Amsterdam	Dutch Republic	For Dutch Republic Navy.
Unknown date	Fredrika Amalia	Fifth rate	Robert Turner	Stockholm	Sweden	For Royal Swedish Navy.
Unknown date	Pauw	Unrated full-rigged ship		Dunkerque	Kingdom of France	For Dutch Republic Navy.
Unknown date	Tholen	Unrated full-rigged ship		Zeeland	Dutch Republic	For Dutch Republic Navy.
Unknown date	Tijger	Unrated full-rigged ship		Amsterdam	Dutch Republic	For Dutch Republic Navy.
