= List of ship launches in 1680 =

The list of ship launches in 1680 includes a chronological list of some ships launched in 1680.

Date	Ship	Class	Builder	Location	Country	Notes
date	Venezia Trionfante	Drago Allungati-class ship of the line	Paolo di Ottavio Corso	Venice	Republic of Venice	For Venetian Navy.
March	Entreprenant	Third rate	Pierre Le Brun	Brest	Kingdom of France	For French Navy.
March	Exeter	Third rate	Johnson, Blackwall Yard	Blackwall	England	For Royal Navy.
May	Suffolk	Third rate	Henry Johnson, Blackwall Yard	Blackwall	England	For Royal Navy.
29 October	Albemarle	Second rate	J Betts	Harwich	England	For Royal Navy.
October	Grand	Second rate	Honoré Mallet	Rochefort	Kingdom of France	For French Navy.
21 November	Ardent	Third rate	Etienne Salicon	Le Havre	Kingdom of France	For French Navy.
Unknown date	Prince	Third rate	Pierre Le Brun	Brest	Kingdom of France	For French Navy.
Unknown date	Terrible	Second rate		Brest	Kingdom of France	For French Navy.
Unknown date	Norske Løve	Third rate		Copenhagen	Denmark	For Dano-Norwegian Navy.
Unknown date	Triton	Unrated full-rigged ship			Dutch Republic	For Dutch Republic Navy.
