= List of ship launches in 1730 =

The list of ship launches in 1730 includes a chronological list of some ships launched in 1730.

Date	Ship	Class	Builder	Location	Country	Notes
26 April	Galicia	Third rate		Barcelona	Spain	For Spanish Navy.
29 April	Fleuron	Third rate	Joseph-Louis Olivier	Brest	Kingdom of France	For French Navy.
24 June	Spence	Drake-class sloop	Richard Stacey	Deptford Dockyard	Great Britain	For Royal Navy.
13 July	San Vincenzo	Fifth rate	Andrea Gallina	Venice	Republic of Venice	For Venetian Navy.
4 August	Terrible	Bomb vessel	Richard Stacey	Deptford Dockyard	Great Britain	For Royal Navy.
10 August	Le Lys	East Indiaman	Gilles Cambry	Lorient	Kingdom of France	For Compagnie des Indes.
4 September	Salamander	Bomb vessel	John Hayward	Woolwich Dockyard	Great Britain	For Royal Navy.
October	Heureux	Fourth rate	Nicolas-Pierre Duclos-Guyot	Toulon	Kingdom of France	For French Navy.
Unknown date	Aborren	Yacht			Sweden	For Royal Swedish Navy.
Unknown date	Karavele-i Cedid-i Evvel	Fourth rate			Ottoman Empire	For Ottoman Navy.
Unknown date	Karavele-i Cedid-i Sani	Fourth rate			Ottoman Empire	For Ottoman Navy.
Unknown date	Fortuné	Galley	Jean Reynoire	Marseille	Kingdom of France	For French Navy.
Unknown date	Palombe	Gabarre	Jacques Poirier	Le Havre	Kingdom of France	For French Navy.
Unknown date	Pintade	Gabarre	Jacques Poirier	Le Havre	Kingdom of France	For French Navy.
Unknown date	Prins Friso	Fourth rate	Thomas Davis	Harlingen	Dutch Republic	For Dutch Navy.
Unknown date	Princesa	Third rate	Ciprián Autrán	Guarnizo	Spain	For Spanish Navy.
Unknown date	Santa Isabel	Third rate		Guarnizo	Spain	For Spanish Navy.
Unknown date	San Isidro	Fourth rate	Ciprián Autrán	Guarnizo	Spain	For Spanish Navy.
Unknown date	Svanen	Fourth rate			Denmark-Norway	For Dano-Norwegian Navy.
Unknown date	Tre Løver	Fourth rate			Denmark-Norway	For Dano-Norwegian Navy.
