= List of ship launches in 1724 =

The list of ship launches in 1724 includes a chronological list of some ships launched in 1724.

Date	Ship	Class	Builder	Location	Country	Notes
1 April	Jason	Fourth rate	Jacques Portier	Le Havre	Kingdom of France	For French Navy.
10 April	Nossa Senfora das Undas	Fourth rate		Lisbon	Portugal	For Portuguese Navy.
30 April	Sunderland	Fourth rate	Benjamin Rosewell	Chatham Dockyard	Great Britain	For Royal Navy.
April	Foudroyant	First rate	Laurent Helie	Brest	Kingdom of France	For French Navy.
1 MAy	Garland	Sixth rate	John Ward	Sheerness Dockyard	Great Britain	For Royal Navy.
8 August	Espérance	Duc d'Orleans-class ship of the line	Rene Levasseur	Toulon	Kingdom of France	For French Navy.
8 September	Rose	Sixth rate	John Hayward	Woolwich Dockyard	Great Britain	For Royal Navy.
19 October	Tigre	Fourth rate	Pierre-Blaise Coulomb	Toulon	Kingdom of France	For French Navy.
22 October	Fubbs	Yacht		Deptford Dockyard	Great Britain	For Royal Navy.
22 October	Seaford	Sixth rate	Richard Stacey	Deptford Dockyard	Great Britain	For Royal Navy.
October	Brillant	Fourth rate	Laurent Helie	Brest	Kingdom of France	For French Navy.
Unknown date	Aagtekerke	East Indiaman		Middelburg	Dutch Republic	For Dutch East India Company.
Unknown date	Akerendam				Dutch Republic	For Dutch East India Company.
Unknown date	Derby	East Indiaman			Great Britain	For British East India Company.
Unknown date	Heemstede	Third rate	Gerbrand Slegt	Amsterdam	Dutch Republic	For Dutch Navy.
Unknown date	Favourite	Galley	Pierre Chabert	Marseille	Kingdom of France	For French Navy.
Unknown date	Perle	Galley	Pierre Chabert	Marseille	Kingdom of France	For French Navy.
Unknown date	Françoise	Catboat		Rochefort	Kingdom of France	For French Navy.
Unknown date	Ludlow Castle	Fifth rate	John Hayward	Woolwich Dockyard	Great Britain	For Royal Navy.
Unknown date	Meervliet	Fourth rate	Gerbrand Slegt	Amsterdam	Dutch Republic	For Dutch Navy.
Unknown date	Pallas	Fourth rate	Gerbrand Slegt	Amsterdam	Dutch Republic	For Dutch Navy.
Unknown date	Prince Frederick	East Indiaman			Great Britain	For British East India Company.
Unknown date	Vredenhof	Fourth rate		Enkhuizen	Dutch Republic	For Dutch Navy.
Unknown date	Yaldızlı Şahin	Third rate			Ottoman Empire	For Ottoman Navy.
Unknown date	No. 1 Longboat	Longboat	John Ward	Sheerness Dockyard	Great Britain	For Royal Navy.
Unknown date	No. 2 Longboat	Longboat	John Ward	Sheerness Dockyard	Great Britain	For Royal Navy.
