= List of ship launches in 1740 =

The list of ship launches in 1740 includes a chronological list of some ships launched in 1740.

Date	Ship	Class	Builder	Location	Country	Notes
7 January	Dover	Fifth rate	Peter Bronsdon	Deptford	Great Britain	For Royal Navy.
21 February	Louisa	Sloop		Bombay	India	For Bengal Pilot Service.
18 March	Prince Frederick	Third rate	Richard Stacey	Portsmouth Dockyard	Great Britain	For Royal Navy.
3 April	Saint George	Second rate		Portsmouth Dockyard	Great Britain	For Royal Navy.
15 April	Bideford	Sixth rate	John Barnard	Ipswich	Great Britain	For Royal Navy.
18 April	Experiment	Sixth rate	Henry Bird	Plymouth Dockyard	Great Britain	For Royal Navy.
1 May	Fox	Sixth rate	John Buxton	Rotherhithe	Great Britain	For Royal Navy.
3 May	Winchelsea	Sixth rate	Robert Carter	Limehouse	Great Britain	For Royal Navy.
17 May	Lyme	Sixth rate	James Taylor	Rotherhithe	Great Britain	For Royal Navy.
31 May	Scarborough	Sixth rate	Philemon Perry	Blackwall	Great Britain	For Royal Navy.
May	Mars	Third rate		Brest	Kingdom of France	For French Navy.
10 June	Lively	Sixth rate	John Quallett	Rotherhithe	Great Britain	For Royal Navy.
1 July	Iupiter	Samson-class bomb vessel	Richard Ramsey	Saint Petersburg	Russia	For Imperial Russian Navy.
1 July	Samson	Samson-class bomb vessel	Richard Ramsey	Saint Petersburg	Russia	For Imperial Russian Navy.
12 August	Restoration	Grab		Bombay	India	For British East India Company.
14 August	Rose	Unrated full-rigged ship	Henry Bird	Rotherhithe	Great Britain	For Royal Navy.
14 August	Success	Sixth rate	Hugh Blaydes	Hull	Great Britain	For Royal Navy.
26 August	Port Mahon	Sixth rate	John Buxton	Deptford	Great Britain	For Royal Navy.
28 August	Blast	Basilisk-class bomb vessel	Thomas West	Deptford	Great Britain	For Royal Navy.
30 August	Basilisk	Basilisk-class bomb vessel	Thomas Snelgrove	Limehouse	Great Britain	For Royal Navy.
30 August	Thunder	Basilisk-class bomb vessel	Elias Bird	Rotherhithe	Great Britain	For Royal Navy.
27 September	Carcass	Basilisk-class bomb vessel	James Taylor	Rotherhithe	Great Britain	For Royal Navy.
24 October	Lightning	Basilisk-class bomb vessel	Henry Bird	Rotherhithe	Great Britain	For Royal Navy.
25 October	Furnace	Basilisk-class bomb vessel	John Quallett	Rotherhithe	Great Britain	For Royal Navy.
26 October	Sérieux	Third rate	René Boyer and Pierre-Blaise Coulomb	Toulon	Kingdom of France	For French Navy.
November	Northampton	East Indiaman	Perry	Blackwall	Great Britain	For British East India Company.
11 December	Bridgewater	Sixth rate	John Pearson	King's Lynn	Great Britain	For Royal Navy.
December	Admiral Vernon	East Indiaman		Deptford	Great Britain	For British East India Company.
December	Scarborough	East Indiaman	Carter	Limehouse	Great Britain	For British East India Company.
Unknown date	Apollon	Fourth rate		Rochefort	Kingdom of France	For French Navy.
Unknown date	Burcht van Leiden	Fourth rate	Charles Bentam	Amsterdam	Dutch Republic	For Dutch Navy.
Unknown date	Chaloupe Carcassiere	Bomb vessel		Dunkirk	Kingdom of France	For French Navy.
Unknown date	Ferme	France-class galley	Jean Reynoire	Marseille	Kingdom of France	For French Navy.
Unknown date	Neptuno	Third rate			Spain	For Spanish Navy.
Unknown date	Oldenborg	Fourth rate			Denmark–Norway	For Dano-Norwegian Navy.
Unknown date	Santiago	Brig			Spain	For Compañia de Caracas.
