= List of ship launches in 1726 =

The list of ship launches in 1726 includes a chronological list of some ships launched in 1726.

Date	Ship	Class	Builder	Location	Country	Notes
9 January	Saint Esprit	Third rate	Pierre-Blaise Coulomb	Toulon	Kingdom of France	For French Navy.
14 March	Alcyon	Fourth rate	Rene Levasseur	Toulon	Kingdom of France	For French Navy.
17 October	Pearl	Fifth rate		Deptford Dockyard	Great Britain	For Royal Navy.
Unknown date	Çifte Arsla Kıçlı	First rate		Constantinople	Ottoman Empire	For Ottoman Navy.
Unknown date	Brave	France-class galley	Jean Reynoir	Marseille	Kingdom of France	For French Navy.
Unknown date	Gloire	France-class galley	Jean Reynoir	Marseille	Kingdom of France	For French Navy.
Unknown date	Noordwijk op Zee	Fourth rate	Jacob Papegaaij	Amsterdam	Dutch Republic	For Dutch Navy.
Unknown date	San Cristobal	Sixth rate		Havana	(Spain) Captaincy General of Cuba	For Spanish Navy.
Unknown date	San Felipe	Third rate	Lorento Arzueta	Guarnizo	Spain	For Spanish Navy.
Unknown date	Woolwich	Hoy		Woolwich Dockyard	Great Britain	For Royal Navy.
