= List of ship launches in 1712 =

The list of ship launches in 1712 includes a chronological list of some ships launched in 1712.

| Date | Ship | Class | Builder | Location | Country | Notes |
|---|---|---|---|---|---|---|
| 13 February | Seahorse | Sixth rate | Richard Stacey | Portsmouth Dockyard | Great Britain | For Royal Navy. |
| 28 February | San Francesco da Paola | Fede Guerriera-class ship of the line | Zuanne de Francesco Piccolo de Venzia | Venice | Republic of Venice | For Venetian Navy. |
| 14 March | Bideford | Sixth rate | Joseph Allin | Deptford Dockyard | Great Britain | For Royal Navy. |
| 25 April | Rose | Sixth rate | Benjamin Rosewell | Chatham Dockyard | Great Britain | For Royal Navy. |
| 30 April | Success | Sixth rate | Richard Stacey | Portsmouth Dockyard | Great Britain | For Royal Navy. |
| 15 June | Poltava | Fourth rate | Fedosey Sklyaev | Saint Petersburg | Russia | For Imperial Russian Navy. |
| June | St. Leopold | | | Naples | (Spain) Kingdom of Naples | For Royal Neopolitan Navy. |
| 8 July | Advice | Fourth rate | Joseph Allin | Deptford Dockyard | Great Britain | For Royal Navy. |
| 23 August | Rippon | Fourth rate | Joseph Allin | Deptford Dockyard | Great Britain | For Royal Navy. |
| 29 November | Mary | Lighter | John Hayward | Portsmouth Dockyard | Great Britain | For Royal Navy. |
| Unknown date | Amsterdam | Second rate | Jan van Rheenen | Amsterdam | Dutch Republic | For Dutch Navy. |
| Unknown date | Caleb | Fourth rate | | | Dutch Republic | For Dutch Navy. |
| Unknown date | Duinvelt | Fourth rate | Jan van Rheenen | Amsterdam | Dutch Republic | For Dutch Navy. |
| Unknown date | Rossum | Fourth rate | Pieter van Zwijndrecht | Rotterdam | Dutch Republic | For Dutch Navy. |
