= List of ship launches in 1710 =

The list of ship launches in 1710 includes a chronological list of some ships launched in 1710.

Date	Ship	Class	Builder	Location	Country	Notes
18 May	Pembroke	Fourth rate	Lock	Plymouth Dockyard	Great Britain	For Royal Navy.
30 September	Jamaica	Sloop of war	Joseph Allitt	Deptford Dockyard	Great Britain	For Royal Navy.
30 September	Trial	Sloop of war	Joseph Allin	Deptford Dockyard	Great Britain	For Royal Navy.
October	Averilla	Full-rigged ship		Rotherhithe	Great Britain	For a private owner.
12 December	Devonshire	Third rate	Ackworth	Woolwich Dockyard	Great Britain	For Royal Navy.
27 December	Cumberland	Third rate	Allin	Deptford Dockyard	Great Britain	For Royal Navy.
Unknown date	Büyük Gül Başlı	Third rate			Ottoman Empire	For Ottoman Navy.
Unknown date	Degas	Snow	I Nerntsov	Tavrov	Russia	For Imperial Russian Navy.
Unknown date	Falk	Snow	I Nerntsov	Tavrov	Russia	For Imperial Russian Navy.
Unknown date	Loosdrecht	Third rate	Jan van Rheenen	Amsteredam	Dutch Republic	For Dutch Navy.
Unknown date	Mercurius	Sixth rate	Jan van Rheenen	Amsterdam	Dutch Republic	For Dutch Navy.
Unknown date	Pernov	Vyborg-class ship of the line	G A Menshikov	Olonetsk	Russia	For Imperial Russian Navy.
Unknown date	Prince Royal	Ship of the line	Phineas Pett	Woolwich	Great Britain	For Royal Navy.
Unknown date	Riga	Vyborg-class ship of the line	Richard Brown	Novaladoga	Russia	For Imperial Russian Navy.
Unknown date	Vyborg	Vyborg-class ship of the line	Richard Brown	Novoladoga	Russia	For Imperial Russian Navy.
Unknown date	Zeelandia	Third rate	Jan van Rheenen	Amsterdam	Dutch Republic	For Dutch Navy.
Unknown date	Zülfikâr Kıçlı	Fourth rate			Ottoman Empire	For Ottoman Navy.
