= List of ship launches in 1728 =

The list of ship launches in 1728 includes a chronological list of some ships launched in 1728.

Date	Ship	Class	Builder	Location	Country	Notes
January	Astrée	Fifth rate	Jean Marguerite Turpinier	Brest	Kingdom of France	For French Navy.
11 April	Triton	Fourth rate	Laurent Helie	Brest	Kingdom of France	For French Navy.
29 May	Pyotr II	Pyotr II-class ship of the line	Joseph Noy	Saint Petersburg	Russia	For Imperial Russian Navy.
1 September	Çifte Kaplan Kıçlı	First rate		Constantinople	Ottoman Empire	For Ottoman Navy.
20 October	Gironde	Sixth rate	Jacques Poirier	Le Havre	Kingdom of France	For French Navy.
20 October	Rubis	Fourth rate	Jacques Poirier	Le Havre	Kingdom of France	For French Navy.
28 November	Flore	Fifth rate		Toulon	Kingdom of France	For French Navy.
Unknown date	Gorinchem	Fourth rate	Paulus van Zwijndrecht	Rotterdam	Dutch Republic	For Dutch Navy.
Unknown date	Assuré	Epervier-class brig	Pierre Chabert	Marseille	Kingdom of France	For French Navy.
Unknown date	Faucon	Epervier-class brig	Pierre Chabert	Marseille	Kingdom of France	For French Navy.
Unknown date	Effronté	Epervier-class brig	Pierre Chabert	Marseille	Kingdom of France	For French Navy.
Unknown date	Inconnu	Epervier-class brig	Pierre Chabert	Marseille	Kingdom of France	For French Navy.
Unknown date	Maas	Third rate	Paulus van Zwijndrecht	Rotterdam	Dutch Republic	For Dutch Navy.
Unknown date	Provincie van Utrecht	Third rate	Thomas Davis	Amsterdam	Dutch Republic	For Dutch Navy.
Unknown date	Unity	Hoy			Great Britain	For Royal Navy.
Unknown date	Westerdijkshorn	Fourth rate	Thomas Davis	Amsterdam	Dutch Republic	For Dutch Navy.
