= List of ship launches in 1687 =

The list of ship launches in 1687 includes a chronological list of some ships launched in 1687.

Date	Ship	Class	Builder	Location	Country	Notes
11 January	Sérieux	Third rate	Laurent Coulomb	Toulon	Kingdom of France	For French Navy.
January	Diamant	Third rate	Howens Hendrik	Dunkerque	Kingdom of France	For French Navy.
7 February	Vittoria	Fourth rate	Matteo di Antonio	Venice	Republic of Venice	For Venetian Navy.
7 February	Sacra Lega	Fourth rate	Beetto Gambillo di Zanmaria	Venice	Republic of Venice	For Venetian Navy.
19 June	Deptford	Fourth rate	Thomas Shish, Woolwich Dockyard	Woolwich	England	For Royal Navy.
24 September	Nuestra Señora de la Concepcion y las Animas	Second rate	Antonio de Amas	Colindres	Spain	For Spanish Navy.
20 December	François	Fourth rate	Etienne Salicon	Le Havre	Kingdom of France	For French Navy.
Unknown date	Brave	Galley	Pierre Hubac	Marseille	Kingdom of France	For French Navy.
Unknown date	Edam	Fourth rate			Dutch Republic	For Dutch Republic Navy.
Unknown date	Hardi	Galley	Simon Chabert	Marseille	Kingdom of France	For French Navy.
Unknown date	Kortgene	Fourth rate			Dutch Republic	For Dutch Republic Navy.
Unknown date	Leiden	Third rate	Jan van Rheenen	Amsterdam	Dutch Republic	For Dutch Republic Navy.
Unknown date	Leijden	Third rate			Dutch Republic	For Dutch Republic Navy.
Unknown date	Salamander	Bomb vessel	Robert Lee, Chatham Dockyard	Chatham	England	For Royal Navy.
Unknown date	Sedgemoor	Fourth rate	Lee, Chatham Dockyard	Chatham	England	For Royal Navy.
Unknown date	St Albans	Fourth rate	John Shish, Deptford Dockyard	Deptford	England	For Royal Navy.
