= List of ship launches in 1716 =

The list of ship launches in 1716 includes a chronological list of some ships launched in 1716.

Date	Ship	Class	Builder	Location	Country	Notes
23 January	La Madonna dell' Arsenal	San Lorenzo Zustinian-class ship of the line	Giacomo Moro	Venice	Republic of Venice	For Venetian Navy.
16 May	Lyon Trionfante	Third Rate	Francesco di Angelo di Ponti	Corfu	Republic of Venice	For Venetian Navy.
23 May	Real Felipe	Third rate		Pasajes	Spain	For Spanish Navy.
May	Gerusalemme	Sloop of War			Republic of Venice	For Venetian Navy.
May	San Antonio di Padova	Sloop of War			Republic of Venice	For Venetian Navy.
May	San Iseppo	Sloop of War			Republic of Venice	For Venetian Navy.
May	San Francesco di Paola	Sloop of War			Republic of Venice	For Venetian Navy.
May	San Pietro	Sloop of War			Republic of Venice	For Venetian Navy.
May	Santa Anna	Sloop of War			Republic of Venice	For Venetian Navy.
May	Venetia	Sloop of War			Republic of Venice	For Venetian Navy.
5 June	Donder	Bomb vessel	Joseph Noy	Saint Petersburg	Russia	For Imperial Russian Navy.
8 November	San Gaetano	San Lorenzo Zustinian-class ship of the line	Zouanne Battista di Zorzi	Venice	Republic of Venice	For Venetian Navy.
8 November	San Pio Quinto	San Lorenzo Zustinian-class ship of the line	Antonio Veruda di Iseppo	Venice	Republic of Venice	For Venetian Navy.
Unknown date	Benjamin	Full-rigged ship		River Thames	Great Britain	For Benjamin Bradley.
Unknown date	Deptford	Lighter	John Ward	Sheerness Dockyard	Great Britain	For Royal Navy.
Unknown date	Essex	East Indiaman			Great Britain	For British East India Company.
Unknown date	Whydah Gally	Galley		London	Great Britain	For Sir Humphry Morice.
