= List of ship launches in 1674 =

The list of ship launches in 1674 includes a chronological list of some ships launched in 1674.

Date	Ship	Class	Builder	Location	Country	Notes
21 March	Fama Volante	Drago Volante-class ship of the line	Zuanne de Piero de Pieri	Venice	Republic of Venice	For Venetian Navy.
June	Oxford	Fourth rate	Baylie	Bristol	England	For Royal Navy.
Unknown date	Barkhout	Transport ship		Dunkerque	Kingdom of France	For Dutch Republic Navy.
Unknown date	Graaf Floris	Unrated full-rigged ship		Dunkerque	Kingdom of France	For Dutch Republic Navy.
Unknown date	Hoen	Unrated full-rigged ship		Dunkerque	Kingdom of France	For Dutch Republic Navy.
Unknown date	Harwich	Third rate		Harwich	England	For Royal Navy.
Unknown date	Jupiter	Unrated full-rigged ship		Dunkerque	Kingdom of France	For Dutch Republic Navy.
Unknown date	Corvette	Unrated barque-longue		Rochefort	Kingdom of France	For French Navy.
Unknown date	Faucon	Hasardeux-class frigate	Jean Guichard	Rochefort	Kingdom of France	For French Navy.
Unknown date	Hasardeux	Hasardeaux-class frigate	Honoré Mallet	Rochefort	Kingdom of France	For French Navy.
Unknown date	Neptunus	Unrated full-rigged ship		Dunkerque	Kingdom of France	For Dutch Republic Navy.
Unknown date	Opperdoes	Unrated full-rigged ship		Dunkerque	Kingdom of France	For Dutch Republic Navy.
Unknown date	Prins te Paard	Unrated full-rigged ship		Dunkerque	Kingdom of France	For Dutch Republic Navy.
Unknown date	Prins te Paard	Unrated full-rigged ship		Noorderkwartier	Dutch Republic	For Dutch Republic Navy.
Unknown date	Prins Willem	Sixth rate			Dutch Republic	For Dutch Republic Navy.
Unknown date	Royal Oak	Third rate	Jonas Shish	Deptford	England	For Royal Navy.
Unknown date	Sundsvall	Fifth rate	Medelpad	Norrland	Sweden	For Royal Swedish Navy.
Unknown date	Tonijn	Advice boat			Dutch Republic	For Dutch Republic Navy.
Unknown date	Wapen van Hoorn	Unrated full-rigged ship		Noorderkwartier	Dutch Republic	For Dutch Republic Navy.
