= List of ship launches in 1673 =

The list of ship launches in 1673 includes a chronological list of some ships launched in 1673.

Date	Ship	Class	Builder	Location	Country	Notes
March	Marquis	Fourth rate	Laurent Hubac	Brest	Kingdom of France	For French Navy.
March	Royal Charles	First rate	Anthony Deane and Daniel Furzer, Portsmouth Dockyard	Portsmouth	England	For Royal Navy.
August	Saint Michel	Third rate	Audibert Coulomb	Marseille	Kingdom of France	For French Navy.
Unknown date	Actif	Fifth rate frigate	Benjamin Chaille	Rochefort	Kingdom of France	For French Navy.
October	Hercule	Third rate	Laurent Hubac	Brest	Kingdom of France	For French Navy.
17 November	Éole	Fourth rate	François Chapelle	Toulon	Kingdom of France	For French Navy.
21 November	Indien	Fifth rate	Laurent Coulomb	Toulon	Kingdom of France	For French Navy.
Unknown date	Chatham	Chatham group sloop	Phineas Pett		England	For Royal Navy.
Unknown date	Drago Volante	Drago Volante-class ship of the line	Paolo di Ottavio Corso	Venice	Republic of Venice	For Venetian Navy.
Unknown date	Neptunus	Fourth rate		Karlshamn	Sweden	For Royal Swedish Navy.
Unknown date	Swiftsure	Third rate	Anthony Deane	Harwich	England	For Royal Navy.
