= List of ship launches in 1663 =

The list of ship launches in 1663 includes a chronological list of some ships launched in 1663.

Date	Ship	Class	Builder	Location	Country	Notes
3 February	Saint Philippe	Ship of the line	Rodolphe Gédéon	Toulon Dockyard	Kingdom of France	For French Navy.
11 July	Prince	Sailing ship		Chatham Dockyard	England	For unknown owner.
December	Padre Eterno	Galleon	Estaleiro do Galeão	Rio de Janeiro	Portugal	For Portuguese Navy.
Unknown	Svärdet	Royal Ship	Robert Turner	Bodekull	Kingdom of Sweden	
