= List of ship launches in 1709 =

The list of ship launches in 1709 includes a chronological list of some ships launched in 1709.

Date	Ship	Class	Builder	Location	Country	Notes
14 January	Lion	Fourth rate	Rosewell	Chatham Dockyard	Great Britain	For Royal Navy.
23 April	Colomba d'Oro	San Lorenzo Zustinian-class ship of the line	Iseppo di Piero de Pieri	Venice	Republic of Venice	For Venetian Navy.
April	Lastka	Fourth rate		Voronezh	Russia	For Imperial Russian Navy.
April	Lion	Hoy		Deptford Dockyard	Great Britain	For Royal Navy.
28 May	Phoenix	Fireship	Gardner Dalton	Rotherhithe	Great Britain	For Royal Navy.
19 July	Bolton	Yacht	William Podd	Portsmouth Dockyard	Great Britain	For Royal Navy.
25 July	Gloucester	Fourth rate	Burchett	Rotherhithe	Great Britain	For Royal Navy.
9 August	Grafton	Third rate	Swallow and Fowler	Limehouse	Great Britain	For Royal Navy.
10 August	Harwich	Hoy	John Poulter	Harwich	Great Britain	For Royal Navy.
13 August	Dublin	Yacht	Joseph Allin	Deptford Dockyard	Great Britain	For Royal Navy.
18 August	Grand Alessandro	San Lorenzo Zustinian-class ship of the line	Antonio Filletto	Venice	Republic of Venice	For Venetian Navy.
19 August	Hampton Court	Third rate	Taylor	Rotherhithe	Great Britain	For Royal Navy.
10 September	Success	Transport ship	Joseph Allin	Deptford Dockyard	Great Britain	For Royal Navy.
18 October	Delight	Sixth rate	Jacob Ackworth	Woolwich Dockyard	Great Britain	For Royal Navy.
Unknown date	Adventure	Fifth rate	Jacob Ackworth	Sheerness	Great Britain	For Royal Navy.
Unknown date	Bouverie	East Indiaman		London	Great Britain	For British East India Company.
Unknown date	Brakel	Fourth rate	Jan van Rheenen	Amsterdam	Dutch Republic	For Dutch Navy.
Unknown date	Buis	Third rate		Hoorn	Dutch Republic	For Dutch Navy.
Unknown date	Ebenetzer	Third rate			Denmark-Norway	For Dano-Norwegian Navy.
Unknown date	Enterprise	Fifth rate	John Lock	Plymouth Dockyard	Great Britain	For Royal Navy.
Unknown date	Fowey	Fifth rate	Richard Stacey	Portsmouth Dockyard	Great Britain	For Royal Navy.
Unknown date	Huis te Neck	Fourth rate		Hoorn	Dutch Republic	For Dutch Navy.
Unknown date	Margate	Sixth rate	Joseph Allin	Deptford Dockyard	Great Britain	For Royal Navy.
Unknown date	Portsmouth	Yacht		Portsmouth Dockyard	United Kingdom	For Royal Navy.
Unknown date	Royal Anne Galley	Fifth rate		Woolwich Dockyard	Great Britain	For Royal Navy.
Unknown date	Seahorse	Sixth rate	Robert Smith	Limehouse	Great Britain	For Royal Navy.
Unknown date	Shpaga	Third rate	Joseph Noy	Voronezh	Russia	For Imperial Russian Navy.
Unknown date	Skorpion	Third rate		Voronezh	Russia	For Imperial Russian Navy.
Unknown date	Spiashchii Lev	Third rate	Richard Cozens	Voronezh	Russia	For Imperial Russian Navy.
Unknown date	Staryi Oryol	Second rate	F M Skylaev	Voronezh	Russia	For Imperial Russian Navy.
Unknown date	Sulitsa	Third rate	Joseph Noy	Voronezh	Russia	For Imperial Russian Navy.
Unknown date	Swan	Sixth rate	Edward Dummer	Rotherhithe	Great Britain	For Royal Navy.
Unknown date	Tombago	Sixth rate	Jan van Rheenen	Amsterdam	Dutch Republic	For Dutch Navy.
Unknown date	Tsvet Voiny	Third rate	Joseph Noy	Voronezh	Russia	For Imperial Russian Navy.
Unknown date	Vredenhof	Fourth rate	Jan van Rheenen	Amsterdam	Dutch Republic	For Dutch Navy.
