= List of ship launches in 1703 =

The list of ship launches in 1703 includes a chronological list of some ships launched in 1703.

Date	Ship	Class	Builder	Location	Country	Notes
10 February	Swallow	Fourth rate	Harding	Deptford Dockyard	England	For Royal Navy.
9 March	Greyhound	Fourth rate	Hubbard	Ipswich	England	For Royal Navy.
13 March	Antelope	Fourth rate	Taylor	Rotherhithe	England	For Royal Navy.
15 March	Leopard	Fourth rate	Swallow	Rotherhithe	England	For Royal Navy.
15 March	Panther	Fourth rate	Popely	Deptford	England	For Royal Navy.
10 April	Falken	Fifth rate	Charles Sheldon	Karlskrona	(Sweden) Swedish Empire	For Swedish Navy.
14 April	Elephanten	Ship of the line	Judichær	Holmen	Denmark-Norway	For Dano-Norwegian Navy.
22 May	Vinkelgak	Third rate	M Beter	Voronezh	Russia	For Imperial Russian Navy.
28 May	Delfin	Third rate	R Semesen	Voronezh	Russia	For Imperial Russian Navy.
10 June	Nottingham	Fourth rate	Harding	Deptford Dockyard	England	For Royal Navy.
22 August	Shtandart	Frigate		Olonets	Russia	For Imperial Russian Navy.
8 December	Toulouse	Fourth rate	Franços Coulomb	Toulon	Kingdom of France	For French Navy.
Unknown date	Bir-Drager	Bir-Drager-class bomb vessel		Olonetsk	Russia	For Imperial Russian Navy.
Unknown date	Eendracht	First rate		Rotterdam	Dutch Republic	For Dutch Navy.
Unknown date	Lepelaar	Fourth rate	Paulus van Zwijndrecht	Rotterdam	Dutch Republic	For Dutch Navy.
Unknown date	Triton	Fourth rate	Jean Marguerite Tupinier	Bayonne	Kingdom of France	For French Navy.
Unknown date	Overijssel	Fourth rate		Rotterdam	Dutch Republic	For Dutch Navy.
Unknown date	Provincie van Utrecht	Third rate	van Leeuwen	Amsterdam	Dutch Republic	For Dutch Navy.
Unknown date	Rotterdam	Third rate	van Leeuwen	Rotterdam	Dutch Republic	For Dutch Navy.
Unknown date	Vein-Drager	Bir-Drager-class bomb vessel		Olonetsk	Russia	For Imperial Russian Navy.
Unknown date	Voronezh	Third rate	V Gerens	Voronezh	Russia	For Imperial Russian Navy.
