= List of ship launches in 1697 =

The list of ship launches in 1697 includes a chronological list of some ships launched in 1697.

Date	Ship	Class	Builder	Location	Country	Notes
1 January	Association	Second rate	Bagwell	Portsmouth Dockyard	England	For Royal Navy.
2 March	Triumph	Second rate	Robert Lee	Chatham Dockyard	England	For Royal Navy.
13 March	Kingston	Fourth rate	Frame	Hull	England	For Royal Navy.
2 May	Amazzone Guerriera	San Lorenzo Zustinian-class ship of the line	Iseppo di Pieri de Piero	Venice	Republic of Venice	For Venetian Navy.
4 May	Rizzo d'Oro	San Lorenzo Zustinian-class ship of the line	Giacomo de Zorzi Grando	Venice	Republic of Venice	For Venetian Navy.
26 May	Exeter	Fourth rate	Bagwell	Portsmouth Dockyard	England	For Royal Navy.
25 June	Ranelagh	Third rate	Fisher Harding	Deptford Dockyard	England	For Royal Navy.
3 August	Aurore	Fifth rate frigate		Le Havre	Kingdom of France	For French Navy.
7 August	Lowestoffe	Fifth rate frigate	Robert Lee	Chatham Dockyard	England	For Royal Navy.
10 August	Barfleur	Second rate	Harding	Deptford Dockyard	England	For Royal Navy.
31 August	Prudent	Fourth rate	François Coulomb	Toulon	Kingdom of France	For French Navy.
15 October	Seaford	Sixth rate frigate	William Bagwell	Portsmouth Dockyard	England	For Royal Navy.
December	Kolokol	Sixth rate	K Kok	Voronezh	Russia	For Imperial Russian Navy.
Unknown date	Anna	East Indiaman	Henry Johnson	Blackwall Yard	England	For British East India Company.
Unknown date	Aquila Volante	Sant'Antonio da Padove-class ship of the line	Terzo Rango	Venice	Republic of Venice	For Venetian Navy.
Unknown date	Beets	Transport ship	Hendrik Cardinaal	Amsterdam	Dutch Republic	For Dutch Navy.
Unknown date	Assuré	Third rate	François Coulomb	Toulon	Kingdom of France	For French Navy.
Unknown date	Namur	Second rate	Lawrence	Woolwich Dockyard	England	For Royal Navy.
Unknown date	Oranjegalei	Fourth rate	Adriaan Janszoon de Vriend	Vlissingen	Dutch Republic	For Dutch Navy.
Unknown date	Southsea Castle	Fifth rate frigate	Fisher Harding	Deptford Dockyard	England	For Royal Navy.
Unknown date	Veere	Fourth rate	Adriaan Janszoon de Vriend	Vlissingen	Dutch Republic	For Dutch Navy.
