= List of ship launches in 1733 =

The list of ship launches in 1733 includes a chronological list of some ships launched in 1733.

| Date | Ship | Class | Builder | Location | Country | Notes |
|---|---|---|---|---|---|---|
| 10 May | Hopes of Russia | Man-of-war | Joseph Noy | Saint Petersburg | Russia | For Imperial Russian Navy. |
| 10 May | Printsessa Anna | Sixth rate | | Saint Petersburg | Russia | For Imperial Russian Navy. |
| 28 May | Mittau | Fifth rate | I. Ramberg | Saint Petersburg | Russia | For Imperial Russian Navy. |
| June | Saint Louis | Brig | Adrien Gilbert | New Orleans | (Kingdom of France) French Louisiana | For French Navy. |
| 4 September | Diamant | Fourth rate | François Coulomb | Toulon | Kingdom of France | For French Navy. |
| 8 September | Pembroke | Fourth rate | | Woolwich Dockyard | Great Britain | For Royal Navy. |
| 25 October | Warwick | Fourth rate | P. Lock | Plymouth Dockyard | Great Britain | For Royal Navy. |
| 24 November | Aquilon | Fifth rate | Rene-Nicholas Levasseur | Toulon | Kingdom of France | For French Navy. |
| 7 December | Christianus VI | Second rate | Benstrup | Copenhagen | Denmark–Norway | For Dano-Norwegian Navy. |
| 15 December | Tilbury | Fourth rate | | Chatham Dockyard | Great Britain | For Royal Navy. |
| 30 December | Éole | Third rate | Joseph-Marie-Blaise Coulomb | Toulon | Kingdom of France | For French Navy. |
| Unknown date | África | Third rate | | Havana | (Spain) Cuba | For Spanish Navy. |
| Unknown date | Goes | Third rate | Hendrik Raas | Veere | Dutch Republic | For Dutch Navy. |
| Unknown date | Gouderak | Fourth rate | Thomas Davis | Amsterdam | Dutch Republic | For Dutch Navy. |
| Unknown date | Hartenkamp | Sixth rate | Thomas Davis | Amsterdam | Dutch Republic | For Dutch Navy. |
| Unknown date | Réale | Galley | Pierre Chabert | Marseille | Kingdom of France | For French Navy. |
| Unknown date | Le Charles Grenot | Sailing ship | | Granville | Kingdom of France | For a private owner. |
| Unknown date | Moriaanshoofd | Fourth rate | Thomas Davis | Amsterdam | Dutch Republic | For Dutch Navy. |
| Unknown date | Slesvig | Fourth rate | | | Denmark–Norway | For Dano-Norwegian Navy. |
| Unknown date | Vlissingen | Fourth rate | Hendrik Raas | Vlissingen | Dutch Republic | For Dutch Navy. |
| Unknown date | Watervliet | fourth rate | Thomas Davis | Amsterdam | Dutch Republic | For Dutch Navy. |
| Unknown date | Zeepaard | Sixth rate | Thomas Davis | Amsterdam | Dutch Republic | For Dutch Navy. |
| Unknown date | Zierikzee | Third rate | Hendrik Raas | Vlissingen | Dutch Republic | For Dutch Navy. |
