= List of ship launches in 1708 =

The list of ship launches in 1708 includes a chronological list of some ships launched in 1708.

Date	Ship	Class	Builder	Location	Country	Notes
8 February	Falmouth	Fourth rate	Stacey	Woolwich Dockyard	Great Britain	For Royal Navy.
20 March	Amarante	Frégate légère	Philippe Cochois	Le Havre	Kingdom of France	For French Navy.
25 March	Resolution	Third rate	Allin	Deptford Dockyard	Great Britain	For Royal Navy.
25 March	Ruby	Fourth rate	Allin	Deptford Dockyard	Great Britain	For Royal Navy.
30 March	Flore	Frégate légère	Philippe Cochois	Le Havre	Kingdom of France	For French Navy.
25 May	Plymouth	Fourth rate	Lock	Plymouth Dock	Great Britain	For Royal Navy.
June	Khobot	Bomb vessel		Olonetsk	Russia	For Imperial Russian Navy.
August	Agathe	Agathe-class barque-longue	Pierre Masson	Rochefort	Kingdom of France	For French Navy.
August	Étoile	Agathe-class barque-longue	Pierre Masson	Rochefort	Kingdom of France	For French Navy.
12 October	Diamond	Fifth rate	William Johnson	Blackwall	Great Britain	For Royal Navy.
18 October	Chester	Fourth rate	Rosewell	Chatham Dockyard	Great Britain	For Royal Navy.
26 October	Store Fenix	Fifth rate	Charles Sheldon	Karlskrona	Sweden	For Royal Swedish Navy.
14 November	Argonaute	Fourth rate	Blaise Pangalo	Brest	Kingdom of France	For French Navy.
2 December	Romney	Fourth rate	Joseph Allin	Deptford Dockyard	Great Britain	For Royal Navy.
12 December	Superbe	Third rate	Pierre-Blaise Coulomb	Lorient	Kingdom of France	For French Navy.
Unknown date	Beskiermeren	Third rate		Saint Petersburg	Russia	For Dano-Norwegian Navy.
Unknown date	Beyaz At Başlı	Third rate			Ottoman Empire	For Ottoman Navy.
Unknown date	Dalem	Third rate		Amsterdam	Dutch Republic	For Dutch Navy.
Unknown date	Hellevoetsluis	Sixth rate		Rotterdam	Dutch Republic	For Dutch Navy.
Unknown date	Huis te Warmelo	Fourth rate	Cornelis Willemszoon Blauwevlag	Medemblik	Dutch Republic	For Dutch Navy.
Unknown date	Lizet	Snow	F M Skylaev	Saint Petersburg	Russia	For Imperial Russian Navy.
Unknown date	Pearl	Fifth rate	Richard Burchett	Rotherhithe	Great Britain	For Royal Navy.
Unknown date	Prins Friso	Third rate	Jan van Rheenen	Amsterdam	Dutch Republic	For Dutch Navy.
Unknown date	Sapphire	Fifth rate	Thomas Podd	Portsmouth	Great Britain	For Royal Navy.
Unknown date	Siyah At Başlı	Third rate			Ottoman Empire	For Ottoman Navy.
Unknown date	Southsea Castle	Fifth rate	Edward Swallow	Rotherhithe	Great Britain	For Royal Navy.
Unknown date	Sweepstakes	Fifth rate		Woolwich Dockyard	Great Britain	For Royal Navy.
Unknown date	Wolfswinkel	Fourth rate		Enkhuizen	Dutch Republic	For Dutch Navy.
Unknown date	Zandvoort	Third rate		Hoorn	Dutch Republic	For Dutch Navy.
