= List of ship launches in 1702 =

The list of ship launches in 1702 includes a chronological list of some ships launched in 1702.

Date	Ship	Class	Builder	Location	Country	Notes
January	Gracieuse	Sixth rate		Le Havre	Kingdom of France	For French Navy.
April	Miach	Sixth rate	A Meyer	Chizhevko	Russia	For Imperial Russian Navy.
April	Vinogradnaia Vetv	Sixth rate	D Albes	Chizhevko	Russia	For Imperial Russian Navy.
26 May	Nymphe	Sixth rate	Philippe Cochois	Le Havre	Kingdom of France	For French Navy.
September	Frigate No. 1	Sixth rate	W Waterson	Syasskaya	Russia	For Imperial Russian Navy.
September	Frigate No. 2	Sixth rate	W Waterson	Syasskaya	Russia	For Imperial Russian Navy.
4 October	Abingdon	East Indiaman		Blackwall	England	For British East India Company.
21 October	Dryade	Sixth rate	Philippe Cochois	Le Havre	Kingdom of France	For French Navy.
Unknown date	Faam	Sixth rate	van Leeuwen	Rotterdam	Dutch Republic	For Dutch Navy.
Unknown date	Hollandia	Third rate	Hendrik Cardinaal	Amsterdam	Dutch Republic	For Dutch Navy.
Unknown date	Kurer	Kurer-class frigate		Arkhangelsk	Russia	For Imperial Russian Navy.
Unknown date	Mercurius	Snow		Rotterdam	Dutch Republic	For Dutch Navy.
Unknown date	Nightingale	Sixth rate	Robert Shortis	Chatham Dockyard	England	For Royal Navy.
Unknown date	Rossum	Fourth rate		Rotterdam	Dutch Republic	For Dutch Navy.
Unknown date	Starrenburg	Fifth rate	van Leeuwen	Rotterdam	Dutch Republic	For Dutch Navy.
Unknown date	Svyatogo Dukha	Kurer-class frigate		Arkhangelsk	Russia	For Imperial Russian Navy.
Unknown date	Taimalar	Snow	I Fedorov	Ramonskaya	Russia	For Imperial Russian Navy.
Unknown date	Tartar	Fifth rate	Fisher Harding	Woolwich Dockyard	England	For Royal Navy.
