= List of ship launches in 1721 =

The list of ship launches in 1721 includes a chronological list of some ships launched in 1721.

Date	Ship	Class	Builder	Location	Country	Notes
1 April	Éclatant	Eclatant-class ship of the line	Blaise Geslain	Brest	Kingdom of France	For French Navy.
18 April	Bonetta	Sloop of War	Richard Stacey	Deptford Dockyard	Great Britain	For Royal Navy.
6 May	Ferret	Sloop of War	John Hayward	Woolwich Dockyard	Great Britain	For Royal Navy.
8 August	Otter	Sloop of War	Richard Stacey	Deptford Dockyard	Great Britain	For Royal Navy.
19 August	Swift	Sloop of War	John Hayward	Woolwich Dockyard	Great Britain	For Royal Navy.
12 September	Berrington	East Indiaman	Thomas West	Wapping	Great Britain	For British East India Company.
24 October	Cruizer	Sloop of War	Ricard Stacey	Deptford Dockyard	Great Britain	For Royal Navy.
7 November	Weazle	Sloop of War	John Hayward	Woolwich Dockyard	Great Britain	For Royal Navy.
23 November	Hawk	Sloop of War	Benjamin Rosewell	Chatham Dockyard	Great Britain	For Royal Navy.
2 December	Spy	Sloop of War	John Naish	Portsmouth Dockyard	Great Britain	For Royal Navy.
Unknown date	Burgvliet	Fourth rate	Jan van Rheenen	Amsterdam	Dutch Republic	For Dutch Navy.
Unknown date	Haarlem	Second rate	Jan van Rheenen	Amsterdam	Dutch Republic	For Dutch Navy.
