= List of ship launches in 1705 =

The list of ship launches in 1705 includes a chronological list of some ships launched in 1705.

| Date | Ship | Class | Builder | Location | Country | Notes |
|---|---|---|---|---|---|---|
| 23 February | Achille | Third rate | Blaise Pangalo | Brest | Kingdom of France | For French Navy. |
| 15 March | Resolution | Third rate | Lee | Woolwich Dockyard | England | For Royal Navy. |
| 29 March | Northumberland | Third rate | Harding | Deptford Dockyard | England | For Royal Navy. |
| 29 May | Drake | Yacht | John Lock | Plymouth Dockyard | England | For Royal Navy. |
| 4 June | Olifant | Fifth rate | V Gerens | Olonetsk | Russia | For Imperial Russian Navy. |
| 7 June | Falk | Sant Iakim-class snow | P Kornilisen | Olonetsk | Russia | For Imperial Russian Navy. |
| 7 June | Luks | Sant Iakim-class snow | V Grar | Olonetsk | Russia | For Imperial Russian Navy. |
| 17 June | Feniks | Sant Iakim-class snow | F Bas | Olonetsk | Russia | For Imperial Russian Navy. |
| 17 June | Snuk | Sant Iakim-class snow | V Graf | Olonetsk | Russia | For Imperial Russian Navy. |
| 19 June | Roza | Sant Iakim-class snow | P Kornilisen | Olonetsk | Russia | For Imperial Russian Navy. |
| 22 June | Hercule | Fourth rate | Desjumeaux | Lorient | Kingdom of France | For French Navy. |
| 21 September | Stirling Castle | Third rate | Rosewell | Chatham Dockyard | England | For Royal Navy. |
| 17 October | Woolwich | Hoy | Joseph Allin | Woolwich Dockyard | England | For Royal Navy. |
| 8 November | Drake | Sloop of war | John Poulter | Woolwich Dockyard | England | For Royal Navy. |
| December | Bombay | Frigate | | Rotherhithe | England | For British East India Company. |
| December | Mars | Fourth rate | René Levasseur | Dunkirk | Kingdom of France | For French Navy. |
| Unknown date | Adler | Pavel-class snow | V Graf | Selitsky Ryadok | Russia | For Imperial Russian Navy. |
| Unknown date | Beber | Pavel-class snow | V Graf | Selitsky Ryadok | Russia | For Imperial Russian Navy. |
| Unknown date | El Salvador | Third rate | | Barcelona | Spain | For Spanish Navy. |
| Unknowndate | Navy | Transport ship | Fisher Harding | Deptford Dockyard | England | For Royal Navy. |
| Unknown date | Staryi Dub | Third rate | Richard Cozens | Voronezh | Russia | For Imperial Russian Navy. |
