= List of ship launches in 1689 =

The list of ship launches in 1689 includes a chronological list of some ships launched in 1689.

Date	Ship	Class	Builder	Location	Country	Notes
8 January	Jeux	Fifth rate frigate	Houvens Hendrik	Dunkerque	Kingdom of France	For French Navy.
June	Gaillarde	Gaillarde-class frigate	Pierre Masson	Rochefort	Kingdom of France	For French Navy.
16 July	Fortuné	Fourth rate	Pierre-Blaise Coulomb	Toulon	Kingdom of France	For French Navy.
21 July	Fleuron	Fourth rate	François Coulomb	Toulon	Kingdom of France	For French Navy.
July	Alcyon	Fourth rate frigate	Hendrik Houvens	Dunkerque	Kingdom of France	For French Navy.
December	Assuré	Third rate	Houvens Hendrik	Dunkerque	Kingdom of France	For French Navy.
Unknown date	Amity	East Indiaman		River Thames	England	For British East India Company.
Unknown date	Brak	Fifth rate frigate		Zeeland	Dutch Republic	For Dutch Republic Navy.
Unknown date	Conquérante	Unrated galley	Simon Chabert	Marseille	Kingdom of France	For French Navy.
Unknown date	Dauphine	Unrated galley	Pierre Hubac	Marseille	Kingdom of France	For French Navy.
Unknown date	Experiment	Fifth rate frigate	Robert Lee, Chatham Dockyard	Chatham	England	For Royal Navy.
Unknown date	Grijpskerk	Fourth rate		Dunkerque	Kingdom of France	For Dutch Republic Navy.
date	Guerrière	Unrated galley	Simon Chabert	Marseille	Kingdom of France	For French Navy.
Unknown date	Hercules	Third rate		Wismar	Wismar	For Royal Swedish Navy.
Unknown date	Jager	Sixth rate			Dutch Republic	For Dutch Republic Navy.
Unknown date	Keurvostin van Brandenburg	First rate	Hendrik Cardinaal, Amsterdam Naval Yard	Amsterdam	Dutch Republic	For Dutch Republic Navy.
Unknown date	Keurvorst van Saksen	First rate			Dutch Republic	For Dutch Republic Navy.
Unknown date	Badine	Fifth rate frigate	Pierre Masson	Rochefort	Kingdom of France	For French Navy.
Unknown date	Landskroon	Fifth rate frigate	Hendrik Cardinaal, Amsterdam Naval Yard	Amsterdam	Dutch Republic	For Dutch Republic Navy.
Unknown date	Tigre	Fifth rate frigate	Hendrik Houvens	Dunkerque	Kingdom of France	For French Navy.
Unknown date	Mercurius	Unrated full-rigged ship			Dutch Republic	For Dutch Republic Navy.
Unknown date	Mercurius	Sixth rate frigate	Jan Salomonszoon van den Tempel	Rotterdam	Dutch Republic	For Dutch Republic Navy.
Unknown date	Phoenix	Sixth rate		Rotterdam	Dutch Republic	For Dutch Republic Navy.
Unknown date	Portsmouth	Second rate	Isaac Betts & William Stigant		England	For Royal Navy.
Unknown date	Provincie van Utrecht	Fourth rate	Jan Salomonszoon van den Tempel	Rotterdam	Dutch Republic	For Dutch Republic Navy.
Unknown date	Railleuse	Frigate		Dunkerque	Kingdom of France	For French Navy.
Unknown date	Santa Cruz	Patache		Guayaquil	Spanish Empire	For Spanish Navy.
Unknown date	Schiedam	Fourth rate	Jan Salomonszoon van den Tempel	Rotterdam	Dutch Republic	For Dutch Republic Navy.
Unknown date	Tijger	Fourth rate			Dutch Republic	For Dutch Republic Navy.
Unknown date	Triton	Unrated full-rigged ship			Dutch Republic	For Dutch Republic Navy.
Unknown date	Wapen von Bremen	Third rate frigate		Bremen	Bremen	For Hanseatic League.
Unknown date	Zeist	Fifth rate frigate		Amsterdam	Dutch Republic	For Dutch Republic Navy.
