= List of ship launches in 1669 =

The list of ship launches in 1669 includes a chronological list of some ships launched in 1669.

Date	Ship	Class	Builder	Location	Country	Notes
16 February	Île de France	Ship of the line		Toulon	Kingdom of France	For French Navy.
February	Charente	Third rate ship of the line	Rochefort Shipyard	Rochefort	Kingdom of France	For French Navy.
March	Paris	Second rate ship of the line	Provence shipyard	Toulon	Kingdom of France	For French Navy.
11 April	Fort	Second rate ship of the line	Jean Guichard	Rochefort	Kingdom of France	For French Navy.
April	Henri	Second rate	Jean-Pierre Brun	Rochefort	Kingdom of France	For French Navy.
May	Rochefort	Third rate ship of the line	François Pomet	Rochefort	Kingdom of France	For French Navy.
24 June	Anne	East Indiaman	Henry Johnson, Blackwall Yard	Blackwall	England	For British East India Company.
30 August	Wallon	Wallon-class ship of the line	Brest Shipyard	Brest	Kingdom of France	For French Navy.
August	Le Havre	Fourth rate frigate	Le Havre Shipyard	Le Havre	Kingdom of France	For French Navy.
25 October	Français	Third rate ship of the line	Hendrik Houvens	Brest	Kingdom of France	For French Navy.
28 October	Saudadoes	Sixth rate sloop-of-war	Anthony Deane	Portsmouth	England	For Royal Navy.
November	Le Saint Antoine de Portugal	Fifth rate			Kingdom of France	For French Navy.
2 December	Republick	Galley		Genoa	Kingdom of Sardinia	For Kingdom of Sardinia.
13 December	Soleil Royal	First rate ship of the line	Laurent Hubac	Brest	Kingdom of France	For French Navy.
Unknown date	Anna Sophia	Second rate ship of the line	Bremerholm shipyard	Gammelholm	Denmark	For Dano-Norwegian Navy.
Unknown date	Berkeley Castle	East Indiaman		London	England	For British East India Company.
Unknown date	Charlotte Amalia	Third rate ship of the line	Zealand shipyard	Copenhagen	Denmark	For Dano-Norwegian Navy.
Unknown date	Gyldenløve	Fourth rate ship of the line	Christiana Shipyard	Copenhagen	Denmark	For Dano-Norwegian Navy.
Unknown date	Mercurius	Fifth rate frigate		Noorderkwartier	Dutch Republic	For Dutch Republic Navy.
Unknown date	St Michael	Second rate ship of the line	Portsmouth Dockyard	Portsmouth	England	For Royal Navy.
Unknown date	Triton	Full-rigged ship			Dutch Republic	For Dutch Republic Navy.
Unknown date	Wapen von Hamburg	Fourth rate frigate		Hamburg	Hamburg	For Hanseatic League.
