= Galera Victoria =

Spanish galleon which sank in 1729

History

Spain
- Name: Galera Victoria
- Port of registry: Guarnizo, Spain
- Builder: Ribeira das Naus
- Launched: 14 February 1729
- Fate: Sank 27 February 1729 during her maiden voyage

General characteristics
- Type: Frigate/Galleon
- Armament: 40 cannon

Galera Victoria was a Spanish galleon that sank in 1729 in the Atlantic Ocean off Gijón, Spain, while she was on her maiden voyage.

== Construction ==
Galera Victoria was launched on 14 February 1729 in Guarnizo, Spain for the Spanish Navy. She was fitted with 40 cannon.

== Sinking ==
On 27 February 1729, Galera Victoria set of on her maiden voyage when she sank in the Atlantic Ocean off Gijón, Spain under unknown circumstances with an unknown number of crew affected by the sinking.
