= List of ship launches in 1683 =

The list of European ship launches in 1683 includes a chronological list of some ships launched in 1683.

Date	Ship	Class	Builder	Location	Country	Notes
January	Apollon	Third rate	Joseph Andrault, 2nd Comte de Langeron	Brest	Kingdom of France	For French Navy.
8 February	Charles II	East Indiaman			England	For British East India Company.
17 April	Neptune	Second rate	John Shish, Deptford Dockyard	Deptford	England	For Royal Navy.
7 June	Brave	Fourth rate	Etienne Salacon	Le Havre	Kingdom of France	For French Navy.
6 November	Solide	Fourth rate frigate	Howens Hendrick	Dunkerque	Kingdom of France	For French Navy.
20 November	Emporté	Fourth rate	Howens Hendrick	Dunkerque	Kingdom of France	For French Navy.
Unknown date	Admiraal Generaal	Second rate	Jan Salomonszoon van den Tempel	Rotterdam	Dutch Republic	For Dutch Republic Navy.
Unknown date	Asia	Full-rigged ship		River Thames	England	For private owner.
Unknown date	Beaufort	East Indiaman	Henry Johnson, Blackwall Yard	Blackwall, London	England	For British East India Company.
Unknown date	Bonaventure	fourth rate	Isaac Betts, Deptford Dockyard	Deptford	England	For Royal Navy.
Unknown date	Christianus V	First rate		Copenhagen	Denmark	For Dano-Norwegian Navy.
Unknown date	Gelderland	Second rate	Jan van Rheenen, Amsterdam Naval Yard	Amsterdam	Dutch Republic	For Dutch Republic Navy.
Unknown date	Hollandia	Second rate			Dutch Republic	For Dutch Republic Navy.
Unknown date	Honslaarsdijk	Fourth rate	Jan Salomonszoon van der Tempel	Rotterdam	Dutch Republic	For Dutch Republic Navy.
Unknown date	Isabella	Yacht	Phineus Pett	Greenwich	England	For private owner.
Unknown date	Belliquese	bomb vessel		Toulon	Kingdom of France	For French Navy.
Unknown date	Fulminante	bomb vessel		Toulon	Kingdom of France	For French Navy.
Unknown date	Ardente	bomb vessel		Toulon	Kingdom of France	For French Navy.
Unknown date	Terrible	bomb vessel		Toulon	Kingdom of France	For French Navy.
Unknown date	Bourbon	Third rate	Honoré Mallet	Rochefort	Kingdom of France	For French Navy.
Unknown date	Eclatante	Sixth rate bomb vessel		Toulon	Kingdom of France	For French Navy.
Unknown date	Maas	Second rate	Jan Salomonszoon van den Tempel	Rotterdam	Dutch Republic	For Dutch Republic Navy.
Unknown date	Prinses Maria	First rate	Simon Janssen Lis, Amsterdam Naval Yard	Amsterdam	Dutch Republic	For Dutch Republic Navy.
Unknown date	San Juan	Fourth rate			Spain	For Spanish Navy.
Unknown date	Stadt en Land	Fourth rate			Dutch Republic	For Dutch Republic Navy.
Unknown date	Zeelandia	Fourth rate	Jan Salomonszoon van den Tempel	Rotterdam	Dutch Republic	For Dutch Republic Navy.
