= List of ship launches in 1682 =

The list of ship launches in 1682 includes a chronological list of some ships launched in 1682.

| Date | Ship | Class | Builder | Location | Country | Notes |
|---|---|---|---|---|---|---|
| 6 May | Arrogant | Third rate | Jacques Doley | Le Havre | Kingdom of France | For French Navy. |
| 28 May | Valor Coronato | Madonna Della Salute-class ship of the line | Domenico Corso di Paolo | Venice | Republic of Venice | For Venetian Navy. |
| 13 June | Duke | Second rate | Thomas Shish, Woolwich Dockyard | Woolwich | England | For Royal Navy. |
| 27 June | Britannia | First rate | Phineas Pett, Chatham Dockyard | Chatham | England | For Royal Navy. |
| 24 August | Ossory | Second rate | Daniel Furze, Portsmouth Dockyard | Portsmouth | England | For Royal Navy. |
| Unknown date | Charles | East Indiaman | | London | England | For British East India Company. |
| Unknown date | Eenhoorn | Fourth rate | | Enkhuizen | Dutch Republic | For Dutch Republic Navy. |
| Unknown date | Fubbs | Royal yacht | Phineas Pett, | Greenich | England | For King Charles II. |
| Unknown date | Gekroonde Burcht | Second rate | | | Dutch Republic | For Dutch Republic Navy. |
| Unknown date | Bombarde | Bomb vessel | Howens Hendrik | Dunkerque | Kingdom of France | For French Navy. |
| Unknown date | Brulante | Bomb vessel | Etienne Salicon | Le Havre | Kingdom of France | For French Navy. |
| Unknown date | Cruelle | Bomb vessel | Etienne Salicon | Le Havre | Kingdom of France | For French Navy. |
| Unknown date | Foudroyante | Bomb vessel | Howens Hendrik | Dunkerque | Kingdom of France | For French Navy. |
| Unknown date | Menaçante | Bomb vessel | Etienne Salicon | Le Havre | Kingdom of France | For French Navy. |
| Unknown date | Bienvenu | Flute | | Toulon | Kingdom of France | For French Navy. |
| Unknown date | Fier | Second rate | Laurent Hubac | Brest | Kingdom of France | For French Navy. |
| Unknown date | Ridderschap van Holland | East Indiaman | | Amsterdam | Dutch Republic | For Dutch East India Company. |
| Unknown date | Svaerdfisken | Fourth rate | | | Denmark | For Dano-Norwegian Navy. |
| Unknown date | Tholen | Fourth rate frigate | | | Dutch Republic | For Dutch Republic Navy. |
| Unknown date | Veere | Third rate | Hendrik Kakelaar | Veere | Dutch Republic | For Dutch Republic Navy. |
| Unknown date | Westfriesland | Second rate | | | Dutch Republic | For Dutch Republic Navy. |
| Unknown date | Unnamed | Horse-powered paddle wheel State Barge | | | England | For Prince Rupert. |
