= List of ship launches in 1672 =

The list of ship launches in 1672 includes a chronological list of some ships launched in 1672.

| Date | Ship | Class | Builder | Location | Country | Notes |
|---|---|---|---|---|---|---|
| 20 March | Bien-Aimée | Rowing frigate | | Toulon | Kingdom of France | For French Navy. |
| 25 May | Bon | Fourth rate | Laurent Hubac | Brest | Kingdom of France | For French Navy. |
| 29 August | Bizarre | Fourth rate | Audibert Coulomb | Marseille | Kingdom of France | For French Navy. |
| 29 August | Fendant | Fourth rate | Joseph Saboulin | Bayonne | Kingdom of France | For French Navy. |
| 29 August | Maure | Third rate | Hontabat | Bayonne | Kingdom of France | For French Navy. |
| 22 September | Incertain | Third rate | Hendrick Howens | Dunkerque | Kingdom of France | For French Navy. |
| Unknown date | Bruijnvisch | Advice boat | Joos Elynck | Vlissingen | Dutch Republic | For Dutch Republic Navy. |
| Unknown date | Christianus IV | Fourth rate | | Copenhagen | Denmark | For Royal Danish Navy. |
| Unknown date | Constantia | Full-rigged ship | | | Sweden | Merchant ship. |
| Unknown date | Cornelia | Fourth rate | | | Dutch Republic | For Dutch Republic Navy. |
| Unknown date | Golden Fleece | East Indiaman | | | England | For British East India Company. |
| Unknown date | Greyhound | Sixth rate | Anthony Dean, Portsmouth Dockyard | Portsmouth | England | For Royal Navy. |
| Unknown date | Indienne | Unrated full-rigged ship | | | Kingdom of France | For Dutch Republic Navy. |
| Unknown date | Mignonne | Unrated barque | | Dunkerque | Kingdom of France | For French Navy. |
| Unknown date | Surprenante | Unrated barque | | Dunkerque | Kingdom of France | For French Navy. |
| Unknown date | Nieuw Rotterdam | Sixth rate | | Rotterdam | Dutch Republic | For Dutch Republic Navy. |
| Unknown date | Oudshoorn | Second rate | | | Dutch Republic | For Dutch Republic Navy. |
| Unknown date | Schattershoef | Fourth rate | Amsterdam Naval Yard | Amsterdam | Dutch Republic | For Dutch Republic Navy. |
| Unknown date | Tonijn | Advice boat | Willem de Graef | Middelburg | Dutch Republic | For Dutch Republic Navy. |
| Unknown date | Uttern | Fifth rate | Medelpad | Norrland | Sweden | For Royal Swedish Navy. |
| Unknown date | Walvisch | Unrated full-rigged ship | | Dunkerque | Kingdom of France | For Dutch Republic Navy. |
| Unknown date | Zeehond | Advice boat | Adriaen Kakelaer | Veere | Dutch Republic | For Dutch Republic Navy. |
| Unknown date | Zwanenburg | Fourth rate | | | Dutch Republic | For Dutch Republic Navy. |
