= HMY Anne =

English royal yacht (1661–unknown)

History

England
- Name: HMY Anne
- Owner: Royal Navy
- Builder: Christopher Pett (Woolwich)
- Laid down: built 1661

General characteristics
- Propulsion: Sail

HMY Anne was an English royal yacht, built in 1661 at Woolwich by Christopher Pett for the Royal Navy.

Service history of HMY Anne
Date(s)	Captain	Station	Actions/Events
1661	James Lambert	-	-
1664	Robert Sheppard	-	-
1666	W. Fazeby	-	-
1668	Robert Sheppard	-	-
1669–1673	Christopher Gunman	-	-
1677	Walter Bynard	-	-
1680	W. Botham	-	-
1681	J. Neville (February)	Tangier	-
1681–1682	G. Aylmer	Tangier	-
1684	Thomas Berry (February)	Tangier	-
unknown	Paul Mercer (April)	Straite Squadron	-
