= HMS Scarborough (1711) =

Fifth rate military 18th century ship

HMS Scarborough was a 32 gun fifth-rate ship built at the Sheerness Dockyard and launched by the Royal Navy in 1711. Her captain was Tobias Hume.

In 1717, the Scarborough caused the destruction of a pirate galley and a sloop near Saint Croix, but failed to capture the crew, who would go on to join Samuel Bellamy. Records of the time also indicate the Scarborough was in the vicinity of Blackbeard the pirate and his crew in February 1717 near Nevis. The deposition of Henry Bostock recounts that the pirates "had met the Man of War on this station, but said they had no business with her, but if she had chased them they would have kept their Way."

In 1720, she was rebuilt at the Deptford Dockyard as a sixth-rate 20 gun ship. She was finally sold to Deptford Dockyard in 1739.
