= List of sailing ships of the Venetian navy =

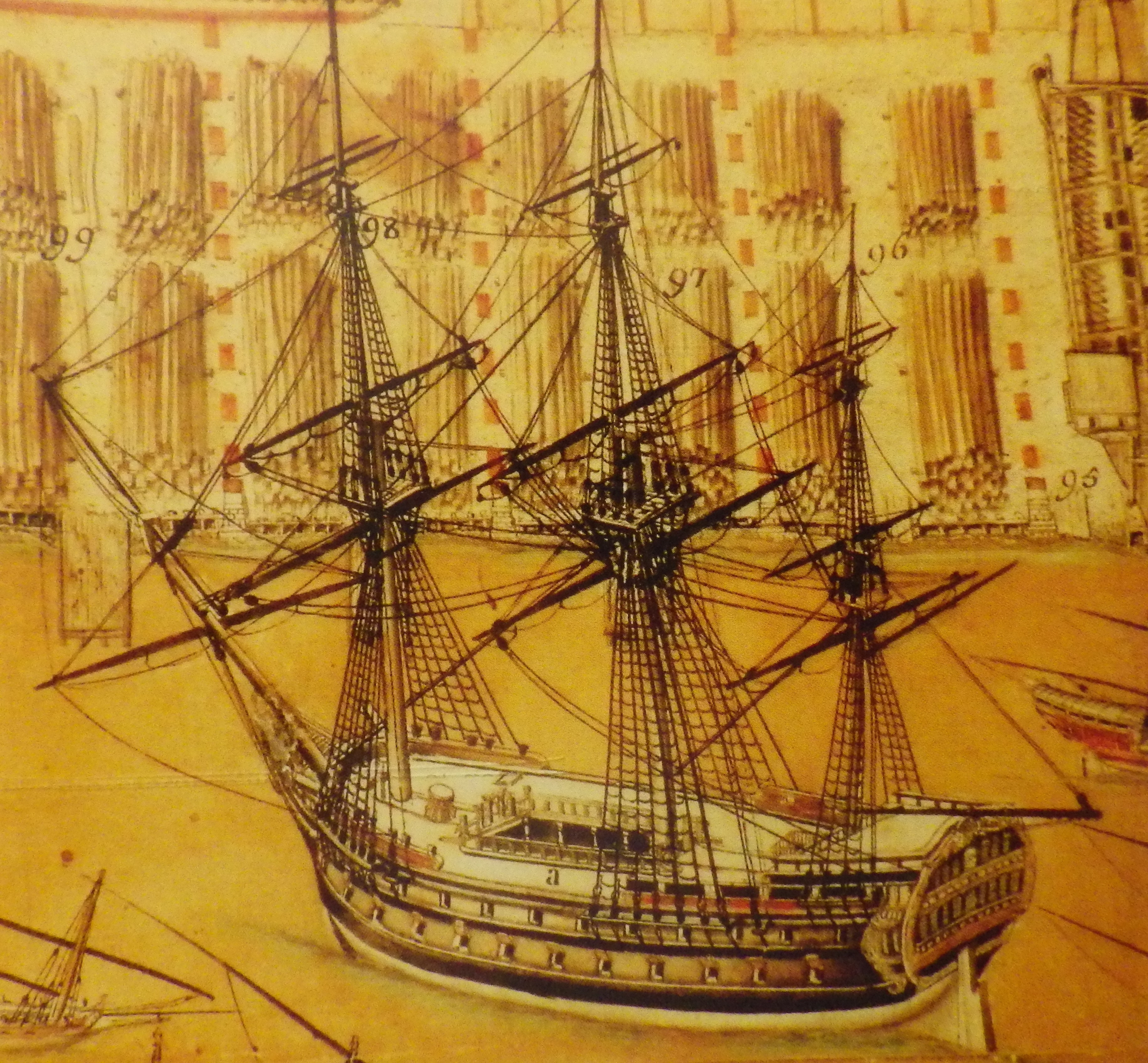
The 70-gun ship of the line Vittoria in the Venetian Arsenal in May 1797, just prior to the fall of the Republic of Venice.

This is a list of sailing ships of the Venetian navy. From the Cretan War to the fall of the Republic of Venice in 1797, the Venetian Republic maintained a good number of sailing ships for its navy, which formed the so-called Armada Grossa, as opposed to the galley-based Armada Sottile. The vast majority of those ships were built in the Venetian Arsenal as some of its roofed shipbuilding docks were enlarged to allow construction of sailing vessels.

== Ships of the Line ==
=== First-rate vessels ===
According to the classification used in the Venetian navy, those primo rango ('first-rate') vessels comprised every two-decked ship armed with more than 62 guns. Usually, the ordnance varied from 68 to 74 guns, but the greatest part of those ships were 70-gun vessels. Since the second half of the 18th century and the appearance of the heavy frigates, the class comprised only ships with more than 68 guns, and those ships of the line were simply called "line vessels".

- Giove Fulminante-class, 4 ships, 1667-1709
- San Lorenzo Zustinian-class, 29 ships, 1691-1746
- Corona-class, 1 ship, 1712-1728
- Leon Trionfante-class, 14 ships, 1716-1797
- San Carlo Borromeo-class, 2 ships, 1750-1797

=== Second-rate vessels ===
The secondo rango ('second-rate') Venetian ships of the line were two-deckers with an armament that varied from 48 to 66 guns. They served as support to the main battle line of primo rango vessels and as scouting ships. After the Peace of Passarowitz in 1718 and the decline of Venetian naval strength, their number was greatly reduced, and from the second half of the 18th century their roles were taken by newly built frigates.

- Drago Volante-class, 5 ships, 1673-1720
- Venere Armata-class, 4 ships, 1676-1717
- San Marco grande-class, 1 ship, 1684-1690
- Sant'Andrea-class, 3 ships, 1685-1752
- Fede Guerriera-class, 4 ships, 1693-1748
- San Spiridion-class, 6 ships, 1717-1738

=== Third-rate vessels ===
The distinction between secondo and terzo rango ('third-rate') Venetian ships of the line was based more on roles that on main armament. Those ships carried from 52 to 40 guns, but had the only role of scouting vessels. As with the second-rate vessels, after Passarowitz the number of ships of this type was slowly diminished and substituted with newly built frigates.

- Madonna della Salute-class, 3 ships, 1675-1717
- Sant'Antonio da Padova-class, 4 ships, 1684-1697
- San Giovanni Battista piccolo-class, 1 ship, 1684-1695
- Scudo Della Fede-class, 2 ships, 1714-1744

== Frigates ==
- Palma-class

== Support ships ==
- Monton d'oro-class, 2 ships, 1688-1695

== See also ==
- Venetian navy
- Venetian Arsenal
- Ottoman–Venetian Wars
