= Battle of Matapan =

1717 naval battle off the coast of southern Greece

- Part of the Seventh Ottoman–Venetian War
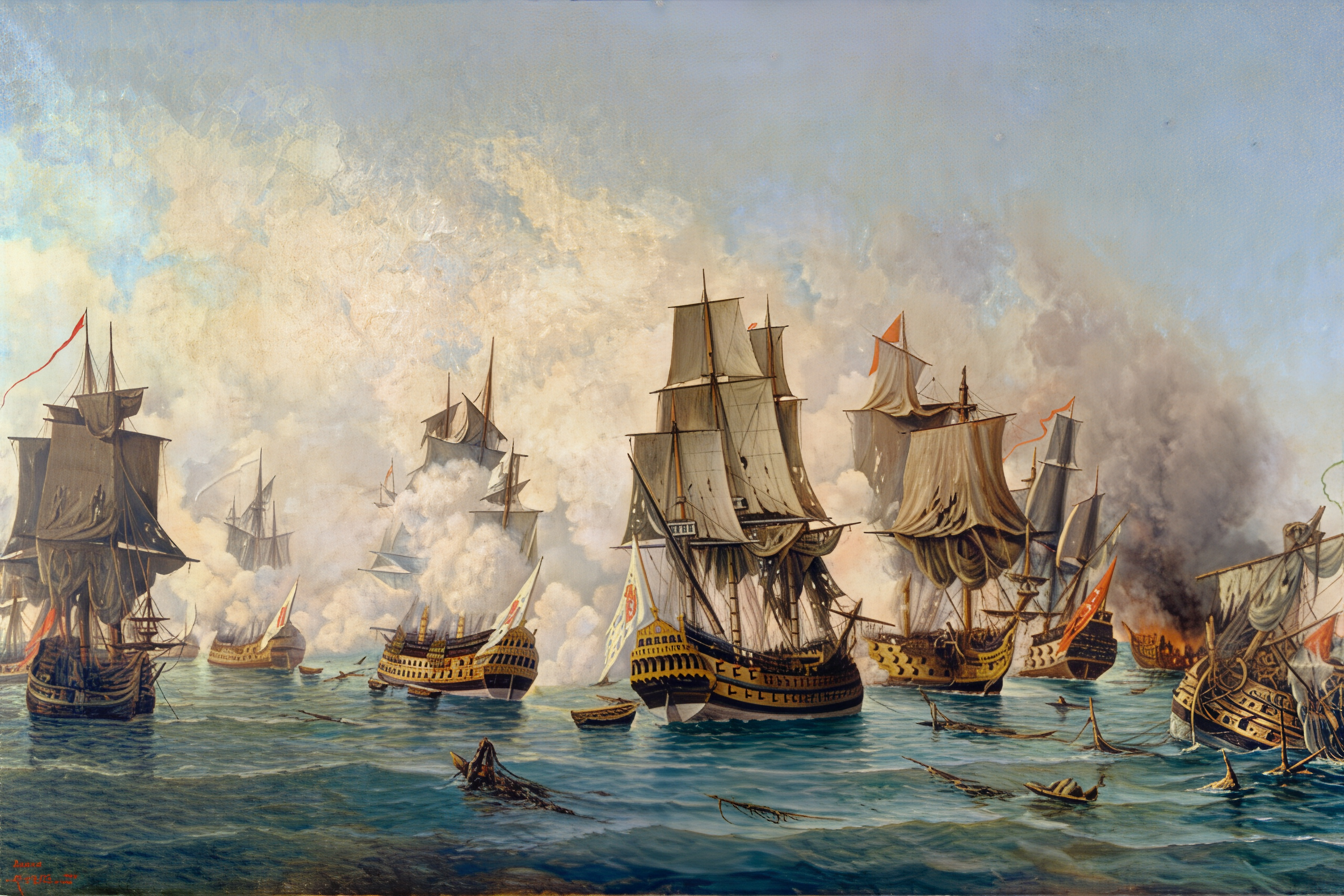
- Batalha Naval do Cabo Matapão, by António José Ramos, copy of the original painting made by João Dantas in 1812.
Date	19 July 1717
Location	Off Cape Matapan, Mediterranean Sea
Result	Portuguese victory

Belligerents
Ottoman Empire	Portugal

Commanders and leaders
Ibrahim Pasha	Lopo F. de Mendonça

Strength
34 ships 24 galleys 1 frigate	8 ships

Casualties and losses
- See Casualties section

The Battle of Matapan, also known as the Battle of Cape Matapan, was a naval battle in the Laconian Gulf, an arm of the Mediterranean Sea, fought between the Kingdom of Portugal and the Ottoman Empire on 19 July 1717, off Cape Matapan in southern Greece. It was part of the Seventh Ottoman-Venetian War of 1714 – 1718.

== Background ==
On July 2, two Venetian squadrons joined forces off of Cape Matapan. The first squadron, composed of 24 sailing ships, was led by Capitano delle Navi Marcantonio Diedo. The second was a squadron of 24 galleys commanded by Captain General of the Sea Andrea Pisani. They met a small squadron of nine mixed Portuguese and Maltese ships led by the French knight Bellefontaine.

The combined fleet, facing unfavorable winds, was unable to reach the island of Sapientza as planned. Desperate for water, they risked being trapped in the Laconian Gulf and sailed to the island of Cranae (Marathonisi), located off of Gytheio, to resupply.

== Previous movements ==
The allied fleet was organized into four divisions: Diedo was in the van; following was the center led by his second-in-command Correr. The third or rear division was commanded by Dolfin. The fourth or allied division was commanded by Bellefontaine.

On 19, July the Venetians sighted the Ottoman fleet of 30 sailing ships and 4 galleys to their south, on the west side of the gulf entrance. The Ottomans, with a light wind from the south-southeast, had the advantage. Diedo was unable to sail to the west of the Ottoman fleet, and he decided to sail east across the gulf.

== Battle ==
At sunrise, Ibrahim attacked Venice's rear division with six of his ships; the rest of the Ottoman fleet sailed ahead and attacked the Venetian van and center. At noon the two fleets approached the eastern side of the gulf. The leading ships then turned as the wind shifted from the southeast, which put the leading Venetian ships to windward of the Ottoman fleet for the first time. Seeing his advantage, Diedo attacked. In the early afternoon the Ottoman fleet retired, sailing for the Cervi–Cerigo (Elafonisos–Kythira) passage; the Venetians and allies sailed for Cape Matapan, the southern tip of the Mani Peninsula. Neither the Ottomans nor most of the Catholic states wished to continue the fight, except Portugal.

With the exception of the Portuguese, all the other Catholic fleets hurried to retreat to the coast. Bearing this in mind, a French Admiral, sent a delegate of his on board of the Portuguese flagship with the mission of removing the Portuguese fleet. That delegate, upon realizing that the Portuguese Admiral was not willing to obey such nonsense, reminded him that the brief obligated him to strict obedience.

It was then that Lopo Furtado de Mendonça remembered putting the copy of the brief, received from the hands of Bellefontaine, in his pocket. He took it out of his pocket, crumpled it into a ball, put it in the mouth of a bronze cannon, ordered the signal fire to be raised and exclaimed to the Frenchman, appalled:

"Go tell to the Bailli de Bellefontaine that I sent the Pope's brief to the Turks through the mouths of my cannons!"

After an hour of fighting, the Turkish fleet was put to flight. The Portuguese had won, alone, the Battle of Matapan. When the Portuguese ships, on their return, anchored in the port of Messina, to rest the garrisons and repair the damage, they were cheered upon disembarking, with the people of the riverside rushing with gifts to the sailors.

== Aftermath ==
In Lisbon, the victory off Matapan was celebrated and served to enhance John V's international prestige. For the support given to the allied Catholic forces, the Portuguese King received the title of the "Most Faithful" and the arch-episcopacy of Lisbon was elevated to the status of a patriarchate.

The Seventh Ottoman–Venetian War was the last conflict between the two powers. The war ended with the Treaty of Passarowitz in 1718.

== Ships involved ==
=== Catholics ===
- Blue Division - Vanguard
  - Madonna dell'Arsenal (Madonna of the Arsenal) 68 guns
  - Costanza 70 guns
  - Trionfo (Triumph) 70 guns (flagship of Admiral Diedo)
  - Leon Trionfante 80 guns
  - San Francesco da Paola 54 guns
  - Aquila Valiera (Valieran Eagle) 70 guns
  - Fenice (Phoenyx) 60 guns
  - Sant'Andrea 60 guns
  - Gloria Veneta (Venetian Glory) 68 guns
- Yellow Division - Center
  - Corona (Crown) 74 guns
  - Madonna della Salute (Madonna of Health) 70 guns (flagship of Almirante Ludovico Diedo, †)
  - Terror 70 guns
  - San Pio V (Saint Pius V) 70 guns
  - San Pietro Apostolo, bought in Livorno, 50 guns
  - Aquila Volante (Flying Eagle) 52 guns, also reported as Aquiletta
  - Fede Guerriera (Warrior Faith) 60 guns
  - Nettuno (Neptune) 52 guns
  - Sacra Lega (Holy League) 50 guns
- Red Division - Rear
  - San Gaetano 70 guns
  - Fortuna Guerriera (Warrior Fortune) 68 guns
  - Venezia Trionfante (Triumphant Venice) 52 guns
  - San Lorenzo Zustinian II 70 guns
  - Grand'Alessandro (Big Alexander) 70 guns (flagship of Almirante Dolfin)
  - Colomba d'Oro (Golden Dove) 70 guns, also reported as Colomba
  - Rosa (Rose) 60 guns, also reported as Rosa Moceniga
  - Valor Coronato (Crowned valour) 52 guns
  - São Lourenço 58 guns (Portuguese)
- Allied Division
  - San Raimondo 46 guns (Maltese)
  - Fortuna Guerriera 70 guns (Venetian)
  - Rainha dos Anjos 56 guns (Portuguese)
  - Nossa Senhora das Necessidades 66 guns (Portuguese)
  - Santa Catarina 56 guns (Chevalier de Bellefontaine - Maltese)
  - Nossa Senhora do Pilar 84 guns (Portuguese)
  - Santa Rosa 66 guns (Portuguese)
  - Nossa Senhora da Conceição 80 guns (General-Admiral Lopo Furtado de Mendoça - Portuguese)
  - Nossa Senhora da Assunção 66 guns (Portuguese)
- Auxiliaries
  - Captain Trivisan (fireship) - Scuttled
  - Madonna del Rosario (hospital ship) - Sunk

==== Galleys ====
13 Venetian
5 Maltese
4 Papal
2 Tuscan

=== Ottomans ===
==== Ships of the Line ====
Kebir Üç Ambarlı (The Great Three Decker) 114 (Flagship of Ibrahim Pasha)
Ejder Başlı (The Dragon) 70
Çifte Ceylan Kıçlı (The Two Gazelles) 70
Yaldızlı Hurma (The Gilded Date) 70
Şadırvan Kıçlı (The Sprinkling Fountain) 66
Siyah At Başlı (The Black Horse) 66
Beyaz At Başlı (The White Horse) 66
Kula At Başlı (The Grey Horse) 66
Büyük Gül Başlı (The Great Rose) 66
Yılan Başlı (The Snake) 34 (unique ship with 2x372 pdr "üç kantar" monster guns firing marble balls)
Ifrit Başlı (The Demon) 62
Küçük Gül Başlı (The Little Rose) 60
Çifte Teber Kıçlı (Two Halberds) 58
Yıldız Bagçeli (The Star Garden) 58
Zülfikâr Kıçlı (The Two Pointed Sword) 56
Akçaşehir (Town of Akçaşehir) 56 guns
Servi Bagçeli (The Cypress Garden) 54
Ay Bagçeli (The Moon Garden) 54
Yeşil Kuşaklı (Green Belted) 54
Sarı Kuşaklı (Yellow Belted) 54
Kırmızı Kuşaklı (Red Belted) 52
Al At Başlı (The Red Horse) 52
Yaldızlı Nar Kıçlı (The Gilded Pomegranate) 52

==== Caravellas ====
Mavi Arslan Başlı (The Blue Lion) 44
Siyah Arslan Başlı (The Black Lion) 44
Taç Başlı (The Crown) 44
Güneş Kıçlı (The Sun) 44
Kuş Bagçeli Karavele (The Bird Garden Caravella) 44
Yıldız Kıçlı (The Star) 40
Mavi Kıçlı Karavele (The Blue Caravella) 38

== Casualties ==
According to Saturnino Monteiro, the Portuguese ships were heavily damaged, with around 50 killed and 150 wounded. The Maltese ships likely suffered fewer casualties as they were involved in combat for a shorter time, while the Venetian ships experienced little to no damage.

As for the Ottomans, Monteiro notes that one ship sank from artillery fire and another was accidentally set on fire, though eyewitnesses do not confirm this. Some claimed up to 6,000 Ottoman deaths, but Monteiro considers this number exaggerated.

== Sources ==
- História da Marinha de Portugal, Editora das Forças Armadas
- Anderson, R. C. (1952). Naval Wars in the Levant 1559–1853. Princeton: Princeton University Press.
- Lane, Frederic Chapin (1973). Venice, a Maritime Republic. JHU Press. ISBN 978-0-8018-1460-0.
- Ercole, Guido (2011). Vascelli e fregate della Serenissima. Trento: GMT. ISBN 978-8890565144.
