= List of shipwrecks in 1768 =

The List of shipwrecks in 1768 includes some ships sunk, wrecked or otherwise lost during 1768.

table of contents
1768
| Jan | Feb | Mar | Apr |
| May | Jun | Jul | Aug |
| Sep | Oct | Nov | Dec |
Unknown date

== January ==
=== 1 January ===
List of shipwrecks: 1 January 1768
| Ship | State | Description |
|---|---|---|
| Prince of Wales | Great Britain | The ship was driven ashore and wrecked near Barfleur, France. She was on a voyage from London to Madeira and Antigua. |
| Rebecca | (Kingdom of Great Britain) British America | The ship was abandoned in the Atlantic Ocean. Her crew were rescued by Nanny (Great Britain). She was on a voyage from Philadelphia, Pennsylvania to North Carolina. |
| St. Peter | Great Britain | The ship was driven ashore near Weymouth, Dorset with the loss of all four crew. |

=== 12 January ===
List of shipwrecks: 12 January 1768
| Ship | State | Description |
|---|---|---|
| Minerva | Great Britain | The ship foundered in Berwick Bay with the loss of all hands. She was on a voyage from London to Leith, Lothian. |

=== 13 January ===
List of shipwrecks: 13 January 1768
| Ship | State | Description |
|---|---|---|
| Two Friends | Great Britain | The ship was driven ashore at Great Yarmouth, Norfolk. She was on a voyage from Königsberg, Prussia to Great Yarmouth. She was later refloated and taken in to Great Yarmouth. |

=== 17 January ===
List of shipwrecks: 17 January 1768
| Ship | State | Description |
|---|---|---|
| Friendship | (Kingdom of Great Britain) British America | The ship was abandoned in the Atlantic Ocean. Her crew were rescued by Champion (Great Britain). |

=== 20 January ===
List of shipwrecks: 20 January 1768
| Ship | State | Description |
|---|---|---|
| Earl of Chatham | Great Britain | The ship was driven ashore and severely damaged in Dublin Bay. She was loater refloated and taken in to Waterford, Ireland. Earl of Chatham was on a voyage from London to Dublin and Jamaica. |
| HMS Fame | (Kingdom of Great Britain) Royal Navy | The third rate ship of the line was driven onto St. Nicholas Island, Devon and severely damaged. She was refloated on 5 February. |
| Freemason | Ireland | The ship was run into by HMS Fame ( (Kingdom of Great Britain) Royal Navy) and driven from her moorings. She subsequently came ashore on St. Nicholas Island and was severely damaged, but was later refloated. Freemason was on a voyage from Waterford to Southampton, Hampshire, Great Britain. |
| Harwood | Great Britain | The ship was driven ashore at Plymouth, Devon. She was later refloated. She was on a voyage from Jamaica to London. |
| Princess of Mecklenburg | Great Britain | The ship foundered. Her crew were rescued by a Dutch vessel. She was on a voyage from Lyme, Dorset to London. |
| Valentine | Ireland | The ship was run into by HMS Fame ( (Kingdom of Great Britain) Royal Navy) and sank in the Hamoaze. She was on a voyage from Cork to Havre de Grâce, France. |

=== 22 January ===
List of shipwrecks: 22 January 1768
| Ship | State | Description |
|---|---|---|
| San Antonia | Spain | The ship was wrecked on the Cayo del Hueso Rocks, off the coast of Cuba. All on board survived, they were rescued on 13 February and taken to Havana. |

=== 26 January ===
List of shipwrecks: 26 January 1768
| Ship | State | Description |
|---|---|---|
| Lovely Cruizer | Great Britain | The ship was driven ashore on Caldey Island, Pembrokeshire with the loss of a crew member. She was on a voyage from London to Liverpool, Lancashire. |

=== 27 January ===
List of shipwrecks: 27 January 1768
| Ship | State | Description |
|---|---|---|
| Neptune | Great Britain | The ship foundered in the Atlantic Ocean 90 leagues (270 nautical miles (500 km)) off the coast of South Carolina, British America. Her crew were rescued by Peggy (Great Britain). Neptune was on a voyage from Glasgow, Renfrewshire to South Carolina. |

=== Unknown date ===
List of shipwrecks: Unknown date 1768
| Ship | State | Description |
|---|---|---|
| Alice | Great Britain | The ship was lost near Cagliari, Sardinia. She was on a voyage from Falmouth, Cornwall to Naples, Kingdom of Sicily. |
| Ann & Mary | Great Britain | The ship was driven ashore and wrecked at the Old Head of Kinsale, County Cork, Ireland. |
| Betsey | Great Britain | The ship foundered. Her crew were rescued. She was on a voyage from "Poston" to London. |
| Commerce | Sweden | The ship was driven ashore at Calais, France. She was on a voyage from Stockholm to Bristol, Gloucestershire, Great Britain. |
| Concord | Great Britain | The ship foundered in the Bristol Channel with the loss of eight of her crew. She was on a voyage from Antigua to Bristol. |
| Duke of York | Ireland | The ship struck the Tuskar Rock and was abandoned by her eighteen crew. She was on a voyage from Philadelphia to Dublin. Duke of York was later towed in to Holyhead, Anglesey. |
| Elizabeth | Great Britain | The ship was driven ashore at Dundalk, County Louth, Ireland. She was on a voyage from Liverpool, Lancashire to Waterford and Jamaica. |
| Favourite | Great Britain | The ship foundered in the English Channel. Her crew were rescued by Bordeaux Packet (Great Britain). Favourite was on a voyage from Helford, Cornwall to London. |
| Flora | Great Britain | The ship was driven ashore at Gibraltar. |
| Friendship | Great Britain | The ship foundered in the Atlantic Ocean off Figueira da Foz, Portugal. Her crew were rescued. She was on a voyage from Falmouth to Naples. |
| HMS Greyhound | (Kingdom of Great Britain) Royal Navy | The sixth rate was driven ashore at Erith, Kent and was wrecked. |
| Hibernia | Great Britain | The ship was driven ashore and wrecked on the Welch Hook, Pembrokeshire. Her crew were rescued. She was on a voyage from Philadelphia, Pennsylvania, British America to Bristol. |
| Holly | Great Britain | The ship was driven ashore and wrecked on the Holderness coast, Yorkshire. |
| Hornet | Great Britain | The cutter was driven ashore in the Isle of Man. |
| Industry | Great Britain | The ship was driven ashore and wrecked west of Cork. She was on a voyage from Boston, Massachusetts, British America to Lancaster, Lancashire. |
| John | Great Britain | The ship foundered in the North Sea off Great Yarmouth, Norfolk with the loss of all hands. She was on a voyage from Berwick upon Tweed to London. |
| Jongste Jan | Dutch Republic | The ship was driven ashore and wrecked at Coverack, Cornwall, Great Britain with the loss of all hands. |
| Jugunder Millo | flag unknown | The ship was driven ashore at Villa Nova. |
| King George | (Kingdom of Great Britain) British America | The ship was driven ashore at Gibraltar. |
| Lamb | Great Britain | The ship was lost at San Sebastián, Spain. She was on a voyage from San Sebastián to an English port. |
| Marianne | France | The ship was driven ashore and wrecked 4 leagues (12 nautical miles (22 km)) from Bayonne. She was on a voyage from Cap-Français, Saint-Domingue to Bayonne. |
| Marlborough | Great Britain | The ship foundered in the Atlantic Ocean off Padstow, Cornwall. Her crew were rescued. She was on a voyage from Jamaica to Bristol. |
| Nightingale | Great Britain | The ship foundered in the Atlantic Ocean off Figueira da Foz. Her crew were rescued. She was on a voyage from Newfoundland, British America to Figueira da Foz |
| Peggy | Great Britain | The ship was driven ashore and wrecked on the north west coast of Ireland with the loss of a crew member. She was on a voyage from North Carolina, British America to Hull, Yorkshire. |
| Penguin | Great Britain | The ship was lost in the Bristol Channel. She was on a voyage from Newfoundland to a British port. |
| Penn | Great Britain | The ship was lost at Bermuda. She was on a voyage from North Carolina to Bristol. |
| Pitt | Great Britain | The ship struck a rock in the River Avon and was severely damaged. |
| Pitt | Great Britain | The ship was run ashore near Dublin. She was on a voyage from London to Dublin and Jamaica. |
| Ruby | Great Britain | The ship was lost at San Sebastián. She was on a voyage from San Sebastián to Ferrol, Spain. |
| Sally | Great Britain | The ship was driven ashore at Gibraltar. |
| Susanna | Great Britain | The ship was driven ashore and wrecked on Gotland, Sweden. She was on a voyage from Riga, Russia to London. |
| Three Brothers | Great Britain | The ship was driven ashore at Appledore, Devon. She was on a voyage from New England, British America to Biddiford, Devon. |
| Unicorn | (Kingdom of Great Britain) British America | The ship was driven ashore at Gibraltar. |
| Vigilence | Great Britain | The ship ran aground on a rock off Green Island, County Down, Ireland and was severely damaged. She was on a voyage from London to Belfast, County Antrim and Londonderry. |

== February ==
=== 2 February ===
List of shipwrecks: 2 February 1768
| Ship | State | Description |
|---|---|---|
| Hungerford | Great Britain | The ship departed from dominica for Bristol, Gloucestershire. No further trace, presumed foundered with the loss of all hands. |

=== 3 February ===
List of shipwrecks: 3 February 1768
| Ship | State | Description |
|---|---|---|
| Enterprize | Ireland | The ship was wrecked at Cape Fear, North Carolina, British America. She was on a voyage from Dublin to Cape Fear. |
| Lark | Great Britain | The ship was lost near Holyhead, Anglesey with the loss of two of her crew. She was on a voyage from Redbridge, Hampshire to Whitehaven, Cumberland. |

=== 8 February ===
List of shipwrecks: 8 February 1768
| Ship | State | Description |
|---|---|---|
| Fort St George | Great Britain | The ship was lost at Bandamalanca, in the East Indies. |
| John & Richard | Great Britain | The ship was driven ashore and wrecked 2 nautical miles (3.7 km) north of Phenix, Rhode Island, British America. She was on a voyage from Liverpool, Lancashire to Philadelphia, Pennsylvania, British America. |

=== 10 February ===
List of shipwrecks: 10 February 1768
| Ship | State | Description |
|---|---|---|
| Adolph Frederick | Dutch Republic | The ship was driven ashore and wrecked on Borough Island, Great Britain. |
| Commerce | Great Britain | The ship was driven ashore and wrecked near Land's End, Cornwall with the loss of eight of her eleven crew. She was on a voyage from Barcelona, Spain to London. |
| Oliver | France | The ship was driven ashore and wrecked at Thurlestone, Devon, Great Britain. She was on a voyage from Marseille to Rouen. |
| Savage | France | The ship was driven ashore and wrecked at Penzance, Cornwall. Her crew were rescued. She was on a voyage from Cette to Honfleur. |

=== 11 February ===
List of shipwrecks: 11 February 1768
| Ship | State | Description |
|---|---|---|
| Fly | Great Britain | The ship was lost at São Miguel Island, Azores with the loss of all hands. She was on a voyage from São Miguel to London. |
| Grizell | Great Britain | The ship was driven ashore and wrecked on the coast of Fife. She was on a voyage from Stockton-on-Tees, County Durham to Leith, Lothian. |

=== 17 February ===
List of shipwrecks: 17 February 1768
| Ship | State | Description |
|---|---|---|
| Diligence | Great Britain | The ship was driven ashore near Wexford, Ireland. She was on a voyage from Liverpool, Lancashire to Boston, Massachusetts, British America. |

=== Unknown date ===
List of shipwrecks: Unknown date 1768
| Ship | State | Description |
|---|---|---|
| Exchange | Ireland | The ship was driven ashore and wrecked at Ballyteague, County Wexford with the loss of seven of her ten crew. She was on a voyage from Bordeaux, France to Dublin. |
| Friendly Brothers | Ireland | The ship was wrecked on the Welsh coast with the loss of all but one of her crew. |
| Globe | Great Britain | The ship foundered with the loss of all hands. She was on a voyage from Amsterdam, Dutch Republic to Swansey, Glamorgan. |
| Grange | Great Britain | The ship was driven ashore and wrecked on the coast of County Wexford. She was on a voyage from Bristol, Gloucestershire to Waterford. |
| Hawke | Great Britain | The ship foundered in the English Channel off Falmouth, Cornwall. She was on a voyage from Waterford to Pool, Dorset. |
| Marie Ann | France | The ship was wrecked on Pendine Sands, Carmarthenshire, Great Britain. Her crew were rescued. |
| Nancy | Ireland | The ship was driven ashore and wrecked on the coast of County Wexford. She was on a voyage from Galway to Bristol. |
| Prosperous | Great Britain | The ship was driven ashore and wrecked on the coast of County Wexford. She was on a voyage from Cork to Dublin. |
| Queen of Angels | Great Britain | The ship was destroyed by an explosion at Barcelona, Spain with some loss of life. |
| São João Baptista | Portuguese Navy | The fifth rate was wrecked at Porto. |
| Success | Great Britain | The ship was wrecked on the Welsh coast. She was on a voyage from Falmouth to Liverpool, Lancashire and Chester, Cheshire. |
| Three Brothers | Great Britain | The ship was driven ashore near Dover, Kent. She was on a voyage from Padstow, Cornwall to London. |
| Ventura | Spain | The ship departed from Cádiz for Lima, Viceroyalty of Peru. No further trace, presumed foundered with the loss of all hands. |

== March ==
=== 1 March ===
List of shipwrecks: 1 March 1768
| Ship | State | Description |
|---|---|---|
| Betsey | Great Britain | The ship was driven ashore and wrecked on Læsø, Denmark. She was on a voyage from London to Danzig. |

=== 3 March ===
List of shipwrecks: 3 March 1768
| Ship | State | Description |
|---|---|---|
| Nancy | Great Britain | The ship was lost at Newcastle upon Tyne, Northumberland with the loss of all hands. She was on a voyage from Newcastle upon Tyne to Sandwich, Kent. |

=== 12 March ===
List of shipwrecks: 12 March 1768
| Ship | State | Description |
|---|---|---|
| Baltic Merchant | Great Britain | The ship was driven ashore on "Heveen Island". She was on a voyage from Hull, Yorkshire to Danzig. |

=== 21 March ===
List of shipwrecks: 21 March 1768
| Ship | State | Description |
|---|---|---|
| Defiance | Great Britain | The ship was lost on the Bahama Banks. Her crew were rescued. She was on a voyage from British Honduras to London. |

=== Unknown date ===
List of shipwrecks: Unknown date 1768
| Ship | State | Description |
|---|---|---|
| Britannia | Great Britain | The ship was driven ashore and wrecked on Skagen, Denmark. She was on a voyage from Newcastle upon Tyne, Northumberland to Danzig. |
| Diana | Great Britain | The ship was wrecked on the Hinder, in the North Sea. She was on a voyage from Rotterdam, Dutch Republic to London. |
| Joanna | Great Britain | The ship was driven ashore and wrecked on the north west coast of Ireland. She was on a voyage from the Clyde to Saint Kitts. |
| John & Elizabeth | Great Britain | The ship was sunk by ice at Pillau, Prussia. |
| Joseph's Increase | Great Britain | The ship foundered in The Swin. She was on a voyage from South Shields, County Durham to London. |
| Lady Dorothea | Hamburg | The ship sank in the Elbe. She was on a voyage from Hamburg to London. |
| Loretta | Great Britain | The ship was driven ashore and wrecked on the Welsh coast. She was on a voyage from Galacia to Topsham, Devon. |
| Lovely Jane | Great Britain | The ship was wrecked in the Strait of Gibraltar. She was on a voyage from Gibraltar to St. Ubes, Portugal and Cork, Ireland. |
| Neptune | Great Britain | The ship was wrecked on the Hinder. She was on a voyage from Rotterdam to London. |
| Olive Branch | Great Britain | The ship was wrecked on the Hinder. She was on a voyage from Rotterdam to Berwick-on-Tweed. |
| Prosperous | Great Britain | The ship was lost whilst on a voyage from Falmouth, Cornwall to Liverpool, Lancashire. |
| Two Brothers | Great Britain | The ship was driven ashore and wrecked near Newry, County Down, Ireland. Her crew were rescued. She was on a voyage from Bristol, Gloucestershire to Lancaster, Lancashire. |
| Union | Great Britain | The ship ran aground on the Hinder. She was on a voyage from Rotterdam to Bristol. Union was later refloated and taken in to Hellevoetsluis. |

== April ==
=== 7 April ===
List of shipwrecks: 7 April 1768
| Ship | State | Description |
|---|---|---|
| Nancy | Great Britain | The ship sprang a leak in the Atlantic Ocean and was abandoned by her crew. They were rescued by Prosper (Great Britain). Nancy was on a voyage from Glasgow, Renfrewshire to Virginia, British America. |

=== 11 April ===
List of shipwrecks: 11 April 1768
| Ship | State | Description |
|---|---|---|
| Pompey | Great Britain | The ship was wrecked west of Kinsale, County Cork, Ireland with the loss of all hands. She was on a voyage from Antigua to Cork and Bristol, Gloucestershire. |

=== 19 April ===
List of shipwrecks: 19 April 1768
| Ship | State | Description |
|---|---|---|
| Minerva | Great Britain | The ship was destroyed by fire in the Martha Brae River, Jamaica. Catherine and Lively (both Great Britain) were damaged. |

=== 20 April ===
List of shipwrecks: 20 April 1768
| Ship | State | Description |
|---|---|---|
| Endeavour | Great Britain | The ship foundered in the Atlantic Ocean. She was on a voyage from Falmouth, Cornwall to Newfoundland, British America. |
| Fly | Great Britain | The ship foundered in the Atlantic Ocean. She was on a voyage from Teignmouth, Devon to Newfoundland. |
| Leopard | Great Britain | The ship foundered in the Atlantic Ocean. She was on a voyage from Dartmouth, Devon to Newfoundland. |
| Peace & Plenty | Great Britain | The ship foundered in the Atlantic Ocean. She was on a voyage from Teignmouth to Newfoundland. |
| Polly | Great Britain | The ship was wrecked on the Stack Rock, Holyhead, Anglesey with the loss of a crew member. She was on a voyage from Lisbon, Portugal to Liverpool, Lancashire. |
| Sally | Great Britain | The ship foundered in the Atlantic Ocean. She was on a voyage from Dartmouth to Newfoundland. |
| Squib | Great Britain | The ship foundered in the Atlantic Ocean. She was on a voyage from Teignmouth to Newfoundland. |

=== Unknown date ===
List of shipwrecks: Unknown date 1768
| Ship | State | Description |
|---|---|---|
| Betsey | Great Britain | The ship was declared missing on 16 April. She was on a voyage from Hull, Yorkshire to Danzig. |
| Britannia | Great Britain | The ship was wrecked on the Spaniard Sand, in the Thames Estuary. She was on a voyage from London to Bristol, Gloucestershire. Britannia was refloated in June and taken in to the River Thames. |
| Countess of Northumberland | Great Britain | The ship was lost; but her crew were rescued. She was on a voyage from Newcastle upon Tyne, Northumberland to London. |
| Eagle | Great Britain | The ship was wrecked at Whitford Point, Glamorgan. She was on a voyage from the Piscataqua River, British America to Bristol. |
| Friendship | Dutch Republic | The ship was driven ashore at Dungeness, Kent, Great Britain. She was on a voyage from Cádiz, Spain to Ostend. |
| Industrious Bee | Great Britain | The ship was driven ashore at Calais, France. She was on a voyage from Rotterdam, Dutch Republic to Milford, Pembrokeshire. |
| Mary | Great Britain | The ship was lost in the Swin. She was on a voyage from Dunbar, Lothian to Memel, Prussia. |
| Porto Merchant | Great Britain | The ship was driven ashore 3 leagues (9 nautical miles (17 km)) from Calais. She was on a voyage from Hull to Cádiz, Spain. Porto Merchant was later refloated and taken in to Calais. |
| Sally | Great Britain | The ship foundered in the Irish Sea off Wicklow, Ireland. Her crew were rescued. She was on a voyage from Chester, Cheshire to Bristol. |

== May ==
=== 7 May ===
List of shipwrecks: 7 May 1768
| Ship | State | Description |
|---|---|---|
| Nancy Service | Great Britain | The ship sprang a leak and was abandoned in the Atlantic Ocean. Her crew were rescued by Prosper (Great Britain). Nancy Service was on a voyage from Glasgow, Renfrewshire to Virginia, British America. |

=== 15 May ===
List of shipwrecks: 15 May 1768
| Ship | State | Description |
|---|---|---|
| Annabella | Great Britain | The whaler was sunk by ice off the coast of Greenland. Her crew were rescued by James & Mary (Great Britain). |
| Catharine | Great Britain | The ship was driven ashore and wrecked in the Humber. |

=== 18 May ===
List of shipwrecks: 18 May 1768
| Ship | State | Description |
|---|---|---|
| Arthur | Great Britain | The whaler was sunk off the coast of Greenland. Her crew were rescued. |

=== 21 May ===
List of shipwrecks: 21 May 1768
| Ship | State | Description |
|---|---|---|
| San Carlo Borromeo | Venetian Navy | The San Carlo Borromeo-class ship of the line foundered. |

=== 26 May ===
List of shipwrecks: 26 May 1768
| Ship | State | Description |
|---|---|---|
| Good Intent | Great Britain | The ship was wrecked on the Craster Rocks, off the coast of northumberland. Her crew were rescued. |

=== 27 May ===
List of shipwrecks: 27 May 1768
| Ship | State | Description |
|---|---|---|
| Goldsbury | Great Britain | The ship was wrecked on the Dogs Head Sand, in the North Sea off the coast of Norfolk. Her crew were rescued. |

=== 31 May ===
List of shipwrecks: 31 May 1768
| Ship | State | Description |
|---|---|---|
| Beggars Benizon | (Kingdom of Great Britain) British America | The ship was wrecked on the French Keys. She was on a voyage from Charles Town, South Carolina to Jamaica. |

=== Unknown date ===
List of shipwrecks: Unknown date 1768
| Ship | State | Description |
|---|---|---|
| Alexander | Great Britain | The ship was lost in the Isles of Scilly. She was on a voyage from Lisbon, Portugal to London. |
| Barry | Great Britain | The ship was lost at Larach, Morocco. She was on a voyage from London to Larach. |
| Farmer | Great Britain | The ship was lost off cádiz, Spain. |
| Henry & Mary | Great Britain | The ship foundered in the Baltic Sea. She was on a voyage from Memel, Prussia to London. |
| Marie Angelique | France | The ship foundered in the North Sea 5 leagues (15 nautical miles (28 km)) off Dunkirk. She was on a voyage from Toulon to Dunkirk. |
| Mary Ann | Great Britain | The ship was lost near Rotterdam, Dutch Republic. She was on a voyage from South Carolina, British America to Rotterdam. |

== June ==
=== 14 June ===
List of shipwrecks: 14 June 1768
| Ship | State | Description |
|---|---|---|
| Marie Susanne | Flag unknown | The brigantine went ashore on the Île Rouge, (Province of Québec?). It was suspected that bullets and merchandises in the ship's cargo were stolen by the nearby inhabitants. |

=== Unknown date ===
List of shipwrecks: Unknown date 1768
| Ship | State | Description |
|---|---|---|
| Antrim | Ireland | The ship was lost in the Orkney Islands, Great Britain. She was on a voyage from British Honduras to Hamburg. |
| Friends Goodwill | Great Britain | The ship was lost whilst on a voyage from Newcastle upon Tyne, Northumberland to Swanzey, Glamorgan. |
| Happy Return | Great Britain | The ship was lost whilst on a voyage from London to Hamburg. |
| Pallas | Great Britain | The ship foundered in the Baltic Sea. She was on a voyage from Hull, Yorkshire to Narva, Russia. |

== July ==
=== 21 July ===
List of shipwrecks: 21 July 1768
| Ship | State | Description |
|---|---|---|
| Lucia | Great Britain | The ship departed from Jamaica. No further trace, presumed foundered with the loss of all hands. |

=== 30 July ===
List of shipwrecks: 30 July 1768
| Ship | State | Description |
|---|---|---|
| Anna Theresia | Great Britain | The ship was driven ashore and was on fire near Cape Florida, British America. Her crew were rescued. She was on a voyage from Pensacola, Florida to Falmouth, Cornwall. |

=== Unknown date ===
List of shipwrecks: Unknown date 1768
| Ship | State | Description |
|---|---|---|
| Porpus | Great Britain | The ship foundered in the North Sea. |
| Tryall | Great Britain | The ship sank off the Isle of Wight. She was on a voyage from "Saloe" to Guernsey, Channel Islands and Dunkirk, France. |

== August ==
=== 6 August ===
List of shipwrecks: 6 August 1768
| Ship | State | Description |
|---|---|---|
| Nancy & Polly | Great Britain | The ship sprang a leak in the Atlantic Ocean and was abandoned with the loss of two lives. She was on a voyage from Belhaven, Virginia to London. |

=== 8 August ===
List of shipwrecks: 8 August 1768
| Ship | State | Description |
|---|---|---|
| Dutchess of Leinster | Ireland | The ship struck a submerged object in the Atlantic Ocean 3 leagues (9 nautical miles (17 km)) off Cape Cornwall, Great Britain and foundered. Her crew survived. She was on a voyage from Dublin to Dunkirk, France. |

=== 9 August ===
List of shipwrecks: 9 August 1768
| Ship | State | Description |
|---|---|---|
| Daniel | Sweden | The ship ran aground on the Kentish Knock and capsized. Her crew were rescued. she was on a voyage from Stockholm to Dunkirk, France. |
| Industry | Great Britain | The ship was driven ashore and wrecked at Grenada. |
| Lelah & Susannah | Great Britain | The ship was driven ashore and wrecked at Grenada. |
| Molly | Great Britain | African slave trade: The ship was driven ashore on Grand Ance. Her 140 slaves were rescued. |
| Polly | Great Britain | The ship was driven ashore at Grenada. She was later refloated. |
| Prince of Orange | Great Britain | The ship was driven ashore and severely damaged at Grenada. She was subsequently refloated. |
| Sally | Great Britain | The ship was driven ashore at St. Patrick's. |

=== 13 August ===
List of shipwrecks: 13 August 1768
| Ship | State | Description |
|---|---|---|
| Lovely Rebecca | Great Britain | The ship was destroyed by fire in the Atlantic Ocean (37°N 56°W). Her crew were rescued by Lady's Adventure. Lovely Rebecca was on a voyage from Antigua to Bristol, Gloucestershire. |

=== 16 August ===
List of shipwrecks: 16 August 1768
| Ship | State | Description |
|---|---|---|
| Apenrade | Great Britain | The ship struck the Chart Rock, in the North Channel and was wrecked. Her crew were rescued. She was on a voyage from Liverpool, Lancashire to Hamburg and Riga, Russia. |

=== 21 August ===
List of shipwrecks: 21 August 1768
| Ship | State | Description |
|---|---|---|
| Alexander | Ireland | The ship departed from Antigua for Belfast, County Down. No further trace, presumed foundered with the loss of all hands. |

=== Unknown date ===
List of shipwrecks: Unknown date 1768
| Ship | State | Description |
|---|---|---|
| London | Great Britain | The ship sprang a leak in the North Sea. She was beached at Great Yarmouth, Norfolk. She was on a voyage from London to a Norwegian port. |
| Mary | Ireland | The ship was wrecked on the Bulls Head Sand, in the Irish Sea. She was on a voyage from Dublin to Ferrol and Málaga, Spain. |
| Woolwich | Great Britain | The ship was destroyed by fire at Carron. |

== September ==
=== 1 September ===
List of shipwrecks: 1 September 1768
| Ship | State | Description |
|---|---|---|
| Hope | Ireland | The ship was wrecked on the Blasques, County Kerry. Her crew were rescued. She was on a voyage from Limerick to Bilbao, Spain and Bordeaux, France. |

=== 3 September ===
List of shipwrecks: 3 September 1768
| Ship | State | Description |
|---|---|---|
| Mary | Ireland | The ship departed from Rochefort, France for Dublin. No further trace, presumed foundered with the loss of all hands. |

=== 4 September ===
List of shipwrecks: 4 September 1768
| Ship | State | Description |
|---|---|---|
| Susannah | Great Britain | The ship, a brigantine or snow, was wrecked in the Bristol Channel 3 leagues (9 nautical miles (17 km)) north of Lundy Island, Devon. She was on a voyage from a Welsh port to Topsham, Devon. |
| No. 3 | Imperial Russian Navy | The galiot was driven ashore and wrecked on Osmussaar. Her crew survived and the ship was dismantled in situ. She was on a voyage from Riga to Reval. |

=== 5 September ===
List of shipwrecks: 5 September 1768
| Ship | State | Description |
|---|---|---|
| Antigua Factor | Great Britain | The ship was lost near Teneriffe, Canary Islands. She was on a voyage from the Strait of Gibraltar to Teneriffe. |

=== 15 September ===
List of shipwrecks: 15 September 1768
| Ship | State | Description |
|---|---|---|
| Beckford | Great Britain | The ship was lost in a gale. |
| Betsey | Great Britain | The ship was driven ashore and wrecked at St. Mary's, Newfoundland, British America with the loss of six of her eight crew. |
| Dolphin | Great Britain | The ship was driven ashore and wrecked in the Horse Islands, British America. |
| Edith | Great Britain | The ship was driven ashore in the Bay of Bulls, Newfoundland. |
| George | Great Britain | The ship foundered in the Grand Banks of Newfoundland with the loss of most of her crew. |
| John of Dartmouth | Great Britain | The ship was lost in a gale. |
| Keppel | Great Britain | The ship foundered in the Atlantic Ocean. Her crew were rescued by Sally (Great Britain). Keppel was on a voyage from London to New Providence, New Jersey, British America. |
| Leopard | Great Britain | The ship was driven ashore and wrecked on Newfoundland. |
| Minerva | Great Britain | The ship was driven ashore and wrecked in the Bay of Bulls. |
| Molly | Great Britain | The ship was driven ashore on the coast of Labrador, British America. She was refloated. |
| Nelly | Great Britain | The ship was lost in a gale. |
| Pond | Great Britain | The ship was driven ashore and wrecked at Newfoundland. |
| Rebekah | Great Britain | The ship was lost at Newfoundland. |
| Samuel & Mary | Great Britain | The ship was lost in a gale. |
| Titon | Great Britain | The ship was lost in a gale. |

=== 17 September ===
List of shipwrecks: 17 September 1768
| Ship | State | Description |
|---|---|---|
| Carolina | Sweden | The ship foundered in the Atlantic Ocean off Padstow, Cornwall, Great Britain. She was on a voyage from Stockholm to Cork, Kingdom of Ireland. |
| Mary | Portugal | The ship was driven ashore and wrecked in Genoa Bay. She was on a voyage from Genoa to Lisbon. |
| Seaflower | Great Britain | The ship was driven ashore in Barnstaple Bay. She was on a voyage from Swansey, Glamorgan to Dublin, Ireland. |

=== Unknown date ===
List of shipwrecks: Unknown date 1768
| Ship | State | Description |
|---|---|---|
| Charming Molly | Great Britain | The ship foundered off the Isle of Arran. Her crew were rescued. She was on a voyage from London to Halifax, Nova Scotia, British America. |
| Concord | Great Britain | The ship foundered in the North Sea 4 leagues (12 nautical miles (22 km)) off Newcastle upon Tyne, Northumberland. She was on a voyage from Newcastle upon Tyne to Rochefort, France. |
| Dolphin | Great Britain | The ship was driven ashore near Aberdeen. She was on a voyage from Danzig to Aberdeen. |
| Emanuel | Hamburg | The ship foundered whilst on a voyage from Hamburg to Cádiz, Spain. |
| Freemason | Great Britain | The ship foundered in the Baltic Sea. She was on a voyage from Wyborg, Old Finland to King's Lynn, Norfolk |
| Neptune | Great Britain | The ship was driven ashore and wrecked on Skagen, Denmark. She was on a voyage from Danzig to Newcastle upon Tyne. |
| Patuxtant | Great Britain | The ship was driven ashore near Sandwich, Kent. She was on a voyage from Maryland, British America to London. She was later refloated and taken in to the River Thames. |
| Preston Trader | Great Britain | The ship foundered in Liverpool Bay with the loss of all hands. She was on a voyage from London to Preston, Lancashire. |
| Prosperous | Great Britain | The ship was driven ashore on Zeeland, Dutch Republic. She was on a voyage from Liverpool, Lancashire to Rotterdam, Dutch Republic. She was later refloated and taken in to Rotterdam. |
| St Michael | Dutch Republic | The ship was driven ashore and wrecked on Bornholm, Denmark. She was on a voyage from Saint Petersburg, Russia to Amsterdam. |
| Two Betseys | Great Britain | The ship foundered in the Atlantic Ocean 20 leagues (60 nautical miles (110 km)) north west of the Isles of Scilly. Her crew were rescued by Susannah (Great Britain). Two Betseys was on a voyage from Southampton, Hampshire to Bristol, Gloucestershire. |

== October ==
=== 13 October ===
List of shipwrecks: 13 October 1768
| Ship | State | Description |
|---|---|---|
| Juliana | Great Britain | The ship foundered in the Swin. She was on a voyage from South Shields, County Durham to London. |
| Thomas & Mary | Great Britain | The ship sank in The Nore. She was on a voyage from Neath, Glamorgan to London. |

=== 15 October ===
List of shipwrecks: 15 October 1768
| Ship | State | Description |
|---|---|---|
| Catherine | Great Britain | The ship was wrecked in a hurricane at Havana, Captaincy General of Cuba. Her crew were rescued. |

=== 26 October ===
List of shipwrecks: 26 October 1768
| Ship | State | Description |
|---|---|---|
| St. Peter | Great Britain | The ship was wrecked on the Goodwin Sands, Kent with the loss of all hands. |

=== 27 October ===
List of shipwrecks: 27 October 1768
| Ship | State | Description |
|---|---|---|
| Carolina | Ireland | The ship was wrecked on the Burbo Banks, in Liverpool Bay. She was on a voyage from Dublin to Liverpool, Lancashire, Great Britain. |
| Dove | Ireland | The ship was wrecked at St David's Head, Pembrokeshire, Great Britain with the loss of all but two of her crew. She was on a voyage from Dublin to Biddiford, Devon, Great Britain. |

=== 30 October ===
List of shipwrecks: 30 October 1768
| Ship | State | Description |
|---|---|---|
| Earl of Chatham | British East India Company | The East Indiaman foundered off Madras, India. |

=== Unknown date ===
List of shipwrecks: Unknown date 1768
| Ship | State | Description |
|---|---|---|
| Amity's Desire | Great Britain | The ship foundered in the Baltic Sea. She was on a voyage from London to Saint Petersburg, Russia. |
| Ann & Mary | Ireland | The ship was driven ashore and severely damaged near Wexford but was refloated. she was on a voyage from Wexford to Cádiz, Spain. |
| Aurora | Great Britain | The ship foundered in the Baltic Sea. She was on a voyage from Saint Petersburg to Glasgow, Renfrewshire. |
| Glencairn | Great Britain | The ship was driven ashore and wrecked on the French coast. |
| Good Intent | Great Britain | The ship was lost on the coast of Finland. She was on a voyage from Saint Petersburg to London. |
| Lady Agatha | Great Britain | The ship foundered in the North Sea off Great Yarmouth, Norfolk. She was on a voyage from Hamburg to London. |
| Penelope | Great Britain | The ship was driven ashore and wrecked near Dublin, Ireland. She was on a voyage from North Carolina, British America to Liverpool, Lancashire. |
| Sally | Great Britain | The ship was driven ashore and wrecked near Wexford. She was on a voyage from Lancaster, Lancashire to the Leeward Islands via Ireland. |
| St. Petersburg | Russia | The ship was driven ashore and wrecked on Gotland, Sweden. She was on a voyage from Saint Petersburg to Nantes, France. |
| William | Great Britain | The ship foundered off Bayonne, France. She was on a voyage from Dartmouth, Devon to San Sebastián, Spain. |

== November ==
=== 5 November ===
List of shipwrecks: 5 November 1768
| Ship | State | Description |
|---|---|---|
| Hawe | Great Britain | The ship departed from Newfoundland. British America for "The Groyne". No further trace, presumed foundered with the loss of all hands. |
| Mary | Great Britain | The ship was driven ashore and wrecked at "Trackfaith", Carmarthenshire with the loss of all but two of her crew. She was on a voyage from Chester, Cheshire to London. |
| Tonein (Тонеин) | Imperial Russian Navy | The galiot was driven ashore and wrecked on Osmussaar. Her crew were rescued. She was on a voyage from Reval to Osmussaar. |

=== 12 November ===
List of shipwrecks: 12 November 1768
| Ship | State | Description |
|---|---|---|
| Bella | Ireland | The ship ran aground in Red Wharf Bay. She was on a voyage from Liverpool, Lancashire, Great Britain to Dublin. |

=== 15 November ===
List of shipwrecks: 15 November 1768
| Ship | State | Description |
|---|---|---|
| Liberty | Great Britain | The ship was wrecked on the Main Reef, in the Bay of Honduras. Her crew were rescued by Ranger ( (Kingdom of Great Britain) Bermuda). |

=== 23 November ===
List of shipwrecks: 23 November 1768
| Ship | State | Description |
|---|---|---|
| General Crawford | Great Britain | The ship foundered in the Bay of Biscay 15 nautical miles (28 km) off Bordeaux, France. She was on a voyage from London to Carthagena, Spain. |

=== Unknown date ===
List of shipwrecks: Unknown date 1768
| Ship | State | Description |
|---|---|---|
| Cecilla | Great Britain | The ship was wrecked on the French coast. She was on a voyage from Great Yarmouth, Norfolk to the Strait of Gibraltar. |
| Harriott | Great Britain | The ship was lost in the Orkney Islands with the loss of all hands. She was on a voyage from Virginia, British America to Aberdeen. |
| Hazard | Great Britain | The ship departed from Newfoundland, British America for Pool, Dorset. No further trace, presumed foundered with the loss of all hands. |
| Isabella | Great Britain | The ship was lost near Padstow, Cornwall. She was on a voyage from Waterford, Ireland to Exeter, Devon. |
| Lovely Betsey | Ireland | The ship was driven ashore at the Poolbeg Lighthouse, County Dublin. She was on a voyage from Dublin to Nantes, France. |
| Polly | Great Britain | The ship was lost near Holyhead, Anglesey. She was on a voyage from Liverpool, Lancashire to New York, British America. |
| Prosperous | Great Britain | The ship was wrecked at Exmouth, Devon. She was on a voyage from Topsham, Devon to Cowes, Isle of Wight. |
| Richard | Great Britain | The ship was sighted off the American coast in late November. No further trace, presumed foundered with the loss of all hands. She was on a voyage from British Honduras to Bristol, Gloucestershire. |
| Success | Great Britain | The ship was driven ashore near Rye, Sussex. She was later refloated and taken in to Rye Harbour. Success was on a voyage from London to Trieste, Republic of Venice. |
| Three Brothers | Ireland | The ship was lost near Calais, France. She was on a voyage from Cork to Hamburg. |
| Totnes | Great Britain | The ship was driven ashore at Douglas, Isle of Man. |

== December ==
=== 1 December ===
List of shipwrecks: 1 December 1768
| Ship | State | Description |
|---|---|---|
| Fredensborg | Denmark–Norway | The frigate sank off Tromøya. |

=== 2 December ===
List of shipwrecks: 2 December 1768
| Ship | State | Description |
|---|---|---|
| Hopewell | Great Britain | The ship was driven ashore at Sandwich, Kent. She was on a voyage from Rotterdam, Dutch Republic to New York, British America. She was later refloated and taken in to Dover. |
| Philadelphia | (Sweden) Finland | The ship was driven ashore and wrecked between Dover and the South Foreland, Kent. Her crew were rescued. She was on a voyage from Finland to Livorno, Grand Duchy of Tuscany. |

=== 10 December ===
List of shipwrecks: 10 December 1768
| Ship | State | Description |
|---|---|---|
| Diligence | Great Britain | The ship was driven ashore at Pool, Dorset. She was on a voyage from Pool to Fowey, Cornwall. |

=== 11 December ===
List of shipwrecks: 11 December 1768
| Ship | State | Description |
|---|---|---|
| Martin | Great Britain | The ship foundered about 5 nautical miles (9.3 km) north west of Bermuda. Her crew were rescued. She was on a voyage from Jamaica to London. |

=== Unknown date ===
List of shipwrecks: Unknown date 1768
| Ship | State | Description |
|---|---|---|
| Echo | Great Britain | The ship was driven ashore near "Steden". |
| Endeavour | Great Britain | The ship foundered off Margate, Kent with the loss of all but two of her crew. She was on a voyage from London to Dartmouth, Devon. |
| Falls | Ireland | The ship was lost in Smeranick Bay, County Kerry. Her crew were rescued. She was on a voyage from Londonderry to Livorno, Grand Duchy of Tuscany. |
| Friendship | Great Britain | The ship was driven ashore and wrecked near Sandwich, Kent. She was on a voyage from Alicante, Spain to London. |
| Nonpareil | Great Britain | The ship was driven ashore and wrecked near Sandwich. She was on a voyage from London to Bermuda. |
| Nossa Senhora da Aparecida | Portugal | The ship was wrecked at Porto with the loss of most of her crew. She was on a voyage from Brazil to Porto. |
| Rouse | Great Britain | The ship foundered in the Atlantic Ocean off Land's End, Cornwall. |
| Santa Catharina | Spain | The ship was lost at San Sebastián. She was on a voyage from London to Bilbao. |
| St. George | Great Britain | The ship was driven ashore and wrecked in Constantine Bay, Cornwall. She was on a voyage from Dublin, Ireland to London. |
| Two Brothers | Great Britain | The ship was driven ashore in Cambleton Bay. She was on a voyage from Liverpool, Lancashire to Dublin. |
| York | Great Britain | The ship ran aground and was wrecked near Charles Town, South Carolina, British America. Her crew were rescued. She was on a voyage from Jamaica to London. |

== Unknown date ==
List of shipwrecks: Unknown date 1768
| Ship | State | Description |
|---|---|---|
| Abigail | Great Britain | The ship was driven ashore at Boston, Massachusetts, British America. She was on a voyage from London to Boston. |
| Ankerwyke | British East India Company | The East Indiaman ran aground off Bengal, India and was severely damaged. She was later taken in to Calcutta. Subsequently repaired and returned to service. |
| Batchelors | Great Britain | The ship was lost on the North Ketchups. She was on a voyage from Philadelphia, Pennsylvania to Lisbon, Portugal. |
| Betsey | Great Britain | The ship was driven ashore and wrecked at Bimlipatam, India. |
| Black River | Great Britain | The ship was wrecked on the Isle of Pines, Cuba. Her crew were rescued. She was on a voyage from Jamaica to London. |
| Cæsar | Great Britain | The ship was lost on a voyage from Hull, Yorkshire to North Carolina, British America. |
| Charles | Great Britain | The snow foundered in the Atlantic Ocean off Chincoteague, Virginia, British America. She was on a voyage from London to Virginia. |
| Charming Molly | Great Britain | The ship foundered in the Bristol Channel. Her crew were rescued by Peggy (Great Britain) She was on a voyage from Falmouth, Cornwall to Bristol, Gloucestershire. |
| Charming Peggy | Great Britain | The ship was wrecked on the Caucas's. She was on a voyage from North Carolina to Jamaica. |
| Dorsetshire | Great Britain | African slave trade: The ship was wrecked at Antigua. All on board were rescued. |
| Earl of Hertford | Great Britain | The ship was lost whilst on a voyage from Cádiz, Spain to New York, British America. |
| Eleanor | Great Britain | The ship foundered in the Atlantic Ocean. Her crew were rescued. |
| Fanny | Great Britain | The ship foundered in the Atlantic Ocean. She was on a voyage from Pool, Dorset to Newfoundland, British America. |
| Good Intent | Great Britain | The ship sank in the Anconia River, Africa with the loss of four of her crew. She was on a voyage from Liverpool, Lancashire to Old Calabar. |
| Hawke | Great Britain | The ship was wrecked on the Shag Rocks, Massachusetts. Her crew survived. She was on a voyage from Jamaica to Boston, Massachusetts. |
| Hope | Great Britain | The whaler was sunk by ice off the coast of Greenland. Her crew were rescued by Royal Exchange (Great Britain). |
| Jago e Santa Anna | Spain | The ship foundered whilst on a voyage from Havana, Captaincy General of Cuba to Cádiz. |
| Jane | Great Britain | The ship foundered in the Atlantic Ocean. Her crew were rescued. She was on a voyage from Montserrat to London. |
| Kildare | Great Britain | The ship was lost in the Delaware River. She was on a voyage from Barbados to Philadelphia. |
| Layton | Great Britain | The ship foundered in the Atlantic Ocean. Her crew survived. She was on a voyage from Jamaica to London. |
| Louisa | Great Britain | The ship was struck by a whale and foundered in the Atlantic Ocean 30 leagues (90 nautical miles (170 km)) off Nantucket, Massachusetts, British America. Her crew survived. She was on a voyage from Cape Anne, Massachusetts to the West Indies. |
| Lucia | Great Britain | The ship foundered in the Atlantic Ocean. Her crew survived. She was on a voyage from Jamaica to London. |
| Mary & Susanna | Great Britain | The ship was lost in the Saint Lawrence River. She was on a voyage from London to Quebec. |
| Nancy | Great Britain | The ship was lost on the Granadilloes. She was on a voyage from Bristol to Nevis. |
| Nancy | Great Britain | The ship was driven ashore and wrecked on Fernando Po Island. She was on a voyage from Old Calabar to Jamaica. |
| Neptune | Great Britain | The ship was lost off Senegal. |
| Neptune | Great Britain | The ship foundered in the Bay of Honduras. Her crew were rescued. She was on a voyage from British Honduras to Livorno, Grand Duchy of Tuscany. |
| Pacific | Great Britain | The ship was lost in the East Indies. |
| Planter | Great Britain | The ship foundered in the Atlantic Ocean. Her crew were rescued. |
| Rachel | Great Britain | The ship was lost near Grenville. She was on a voyage from Maryland, British America to London. |
| Renah | (Kingdom of Great Britain) British America | The sloop was wrecked on the south coast of Cuba. Her crew were rescued. She was on a voyage from Jamaica to Edenton, North Carolina. |
| Salisbury | Great Britain | The ship was lost whilst on a voyage from New England, British America to the West Indies. |
| Sally | Ireland | The ship was driven ashore at Little Egg Harbour, New Jersey, British America. She was on a voyage from Newry, County Antrim to Philadelphia, Pennsylvania. |
| Ward | Great Britain | The ship was wrecked on Útila, British Honduras. She was on a voyage from British Honduras to the Windward Islands. |
| Wells | Great Britain | The ship departed from Saint Kitts for Bristol in late February or early March. No further trace, presumed foundered with the loss of all hands. |
