= List of ship launches in 1739 =

The list of ship launches in 1739 includes a chronological list of some ships launched in 1739.

Date	Ship	Class	Builder	Location	Country	Notes
3 August	Adria in Pace	Third rate	Andrea Gallina	Venice	Republic of Venice	For Venetian Navy.
23 October	Europa	Third rate	Zuanne Novello	Venice	Republic of Venice	For Venetian Navy.
Unknown date	Anne Galley	Merchantman		Deptford	Great Britain	For George Stevens.
Unknown date	Bombay	Grab	Blake Tyson	Bombay	India	For Bombay Marine.
Unknown date	Bystraia	Galley		Sea of Azov	Russia	For Don Military Flotilla.
Unknown date	Chatham Longboat	Longboat	John Ward	Chatham Dockyard	Great Britain	For Royal Navy.
19 December	Terrible	Third rate	François Coulomb	Toulon	Kingdom of France	For French Navy.
Unknown date	Delfin	Galley		Sea of Azov	Russia	For Don Military Flotilla.
Unknown date	Dordrecht	Fourth rate	Jacob Spaans	Rotterdam	Dutch Republic	For Dutch Navy.
Unknown date	Galera Paruta	Galley			Republic of Venice	For Venetian Navy.
Unknown date	Glorioso	Third rate		Havana	(Spain) Cuba	For Spanish Navy.
Unknown date	Invencible	Invencible-class ship of the line	Juan de Acosta	Havana	(Spain) Cuba	For Spanish Navy.
Unknown date	Iupiter	Galley		Sea of Azov	Russia	For Don Military Flotilla.
Unknown date	Kit	Galley		Sea of Azov	Russia	For Don Military Flotilla.
Unknown date	Leon Coronato	Merchantman			Republic of Venice	For private owner.
Unknown date	Lev	Galley		Sea of Azov	Russia	For Don Military Flotilla.
Unknown date	L'Hercule	East Indiaman	Gilles Cambry	Lorient	Kingdom of France	For French East India Company.
Unknown date	Maarsen	Fourth rate	Charles Bentam	Amsterdam	Dutch Republic	For Dutch Navy.
Unknown date	Minerva	Galley		Sea of Azov	Russia	For Don Military Flotilla.
Unknown date	Moliniia	Galley		Sea of Azov	Russia	For Don Military Flotilla.
Unknown date	Nadezhda	Galley		Sea of Azov	Russia	For Don Military Flotilla.
Unknown date	Nepobedimia	Galley		Sea of Azov	Russia	For Don Military Flotilla.
Unknown date	Oryol	Galley		Sea of Azov	Russia	For Don Military Flotilla.
Unknown date	Pobeda	Galley		Sea of Azov	Russia	For Don Military Flotilla.
Unknown date	Salamandra	Galley		Sea of Azov	Russia	For Don Military Flotilla.
Unknown date	Santissima Trinità e San Giovanni	Merchantman			Republic of Venice	For private owner.
Unknown date	Svirepaia	Galley		Sea of Azov	Russia	For Don Military Flotilla.
Unknown date	Sokol	Galley		Sea of Azov	Russia	For Don Military Flotilla.
Unknown date	Strakh	Galley		Sea of Azov	Russia	For Don Military Flotilla.
Unknown date	Upovanie	Galley		Sea of Azov	Russia	For Don Military Flotilla.
Unknown date	Venera	Galley		Sea of Azov	Russia	For Don Military Flotilla.
Unknown date	Vydra	Galley		Sea of Azov	Russia	For Don Military Flotilla.
Unknown date	Zmela	Galley		Sea of Azov	Russia	For Don Military Flotilla.
Unknown date	Zvezda	Galley		Sea of Azov	Russia	For Don Military Flotilla.
