= Lopo Furtado de Mendonça, 1st Count of Rio Grande =

Portuguese nobleman and naval officer (1661–1730)

His Lordship The Count of Rio Grande ComA ComSE
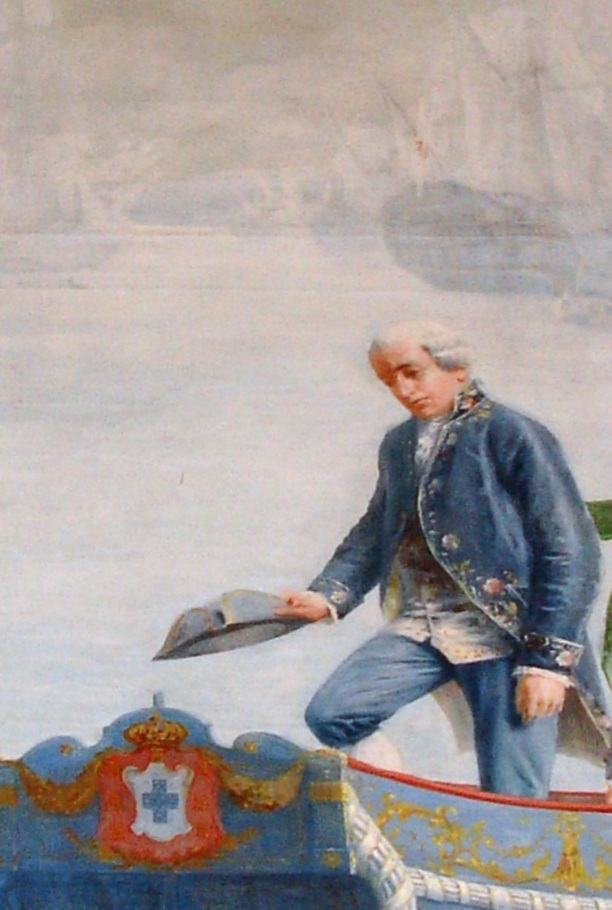
- Fancy portrait by Arthur de Mello, detail of Embarque do Conde de Rio Grande (1904)
- Born: 1661; Portugal
- Died: 20 November 1730 (aged 68–69); Lisbon, Portugal
- Military career
- Allegiance: Kingdom of Portugal
- Branch: Portuguese Navy; Portuguese Army
- Rank: Admiral (Navy); Field Marshal (Army)
- Conflicts: War of the Spanish Succession; Seventh Ottoman-Venetian War; Battle of Matapan

D. Lopo Furtado de Mendonça, 1st Count of Rio Grande and 12th Lord of the Majorat of Quarteira (1661 – 20 November 1730) was a Portuguese nobleman and naval officer.

== Early life ==
He was born in 1661 to Jorge Furtado de Mendonça, mestre de campo of the Algarve and admiral of the fleet of the Junta do Comércio.

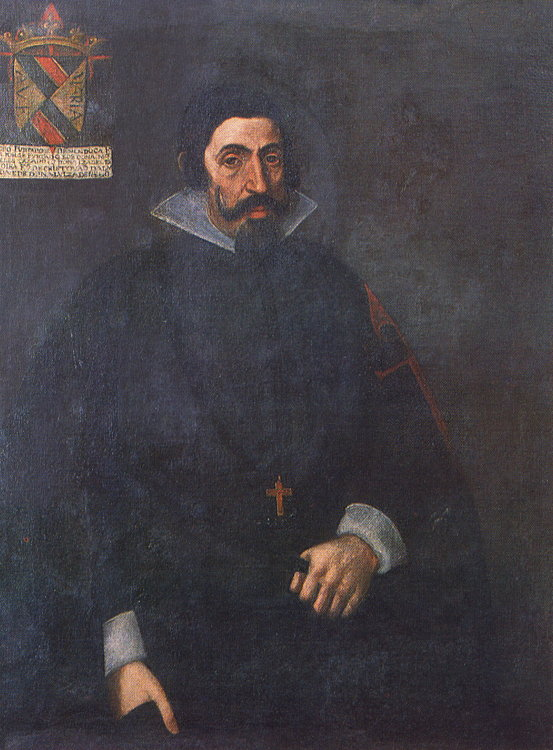
Lopo Furtado de Mendonça, his grandfather, portraited by Domingos Vieira in 1635

== Portuguese Navy ==
He had several titles, such as commander of Borba in the Order of Avis and of Loulé in the Order of Santiago, captain of the Royal Guard, field marshal, counselor of the Council of War, count of Rio Grande, by jure uxoris, grande of Portugal, colonel of the Navy Regiment and vice admiral.

He fought, very young, in Mazagan, having also commanded the Terço da Armada Real. He embarked several times in the coast guard squadron. He was nominated admiral in 1702. In 1704, he fought against Spain, war in which he reached the rank of field marshal, even though he was already an admiral.

In 1716 he commanded a squadron that went to the Mediterranean Sea to fight the Turks, who were not seen. He returned to the Mediterranean in 1717, where he won the Battle of Matapan. In this battle, the ship Nossa Senhora da Conceição served as his flagship, the second commander of the fleet, the Count of São Vicente, had as his flagship the powerful Nossa Senhora do Pilar, other ships: Nossa Senhora da Assunção, Nossa Senhora das Necessidades, Rainha dos Anjos, commanded by Infante Francisco, São Lourenço and the Santa Rosa. There were around 500 cannons.

Despite the superiority and excellence of the Portuguese fleet over the others in the coalition, Pope Clement XI issued a brief in which he handed over command of the coalition to the Lieutenant General of the French Navy, Bellefontaine, who hurried to personally deliver a copy of that brief to the Portuguese Admiral.

With the exception of the Portuguese, all the other fleets hurried to retreat to the coast upon sighting the Turks. Bearing this in mind, the French Admiral, sent a delegate of his on board of the Portuguese flagship with the mission of removing the Portuguese fleet. That delegate, upon realizing that the Portuguese Admiral was not willing to obey such nonsense, reminded the Count of Rio Grande that the brief obligated him to strict obedience.

It was then that Lopo Furtado de Mendonça remembered putting the copy of the brief, received from the hands of Bellefontaine, in his pocket. He took it out of his pocket, crumpled it into a ball, put it in the mouth of a bronze cannon, ordered the signal fire to be raised and exclaimed to the Frenchman, appalled:

"Go tell to the Bailli de Bellefontaine that I sent the Pope's brief to the Turks through the mouths of my cannons!"

After an hour of fighting, the Turkish fleet was put to flight. The Portuguese had won, alone, the Battle of Matapan. When the Portuguese ships, on their return, anchored in the port of Messina, to rest the garrisons and repair the damage, they were cheered upon disembarking, with the people of the riverside rushing with gifts to the sailors.

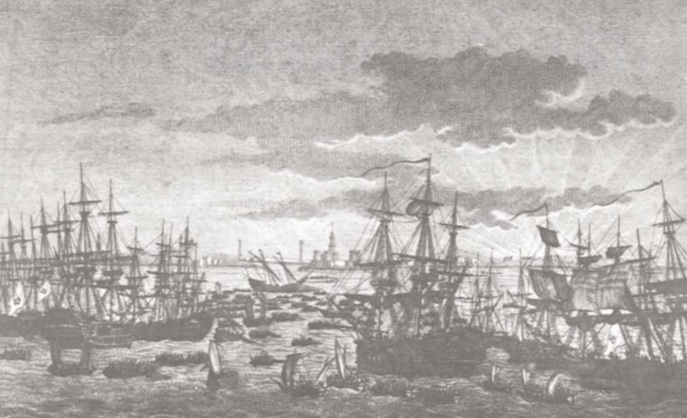
The Portuguese squadron anchored in Messina, after the Battle of Cape Matapan on 19 July 1717

King John V showered him with benefits, nominating him Count of Rio Grande, by the bond of the title to which his wife was entitled for being the daughter of General Francisco Barreto de Meneses, who had expelled the Dutch from Pernambuco, and who, having received this title, had never used it. The King also gave him the position of Chief Accountant of the Kingdom.

== Later life ==
In addition to the daughters he had, Lopo had a son, named José António Barreto Furtado de Mendonça e Meneses, a capitão de cavalos of the Alentejo Province, who was born in 1688 and died unmarried on 2 August 1707.

He died in Lisbon, after a few days of illness, at 11:00 p.m., on 20 November 1730. The Gazeta de Lisboa described his career and funeral:

"...having served this Crown for close to sixty years, partly in the Stronghold of Mazagan, partly in the Fleets of the Coast, in the expedition of Corfu, and in the campaigns of the last war. He was buried in Chagas de Cristo Church, Chapel of the Seamen, where all the Nobility of the Court attended his funeral."
