= Portuguese ship Nossa Senhora da Conceição =

Two ships of the Portuguese Navy have been named Nossa Senhora da Conceição

- Portuguese ship Nossa Senhora da Conceição (1701), 80-gun ship of the line
- Portuguese ship Nossa Senhora da Conceição (1771), 90-gun ship of the line; renamed to Príncipe Real in 1794
