= Venetian ship San Carlo Borromeo =

San Carlo Borromeo was a first-rank ship of the line of the Venetian navy, serving from 1750 to 1768.

San Carlo Borromeo was originally laid down in 1739 as part of the Leon Trionfante class, but her chief architect, Marco Nobile, altered the design so that it became the lead ship of its own class instead. In its final form, it had a length of slightly over 51 metres (167 ft), a displacement of c. 2300 tons, and armed with 74 cannon, although normally, in peacetime, she only carried 66 (28x40-pounders, 26x20-pounders, 12x14-pounders). She entered service in 1750. In 1758, under the command of Angelo Emo, a new mast configuration—rather than made out of single tree-trunks, they were composed of different pieces of wood—inspired by English models was tested.

Throughout its career, the ship was plagued by a tendency to lose its rudder in heavy weather; during a mission into the Atlantic Sea in 1758, she almost foundered off the coast of Portugal. Several commissions and experiments were conducted in subsequent years to find the cause of the problem and rectify it, however the ship was lost with all hands during a storm on 21 March 1768, while sailing in the Adriatic Sea.

== See also ==
- Venetian navy
- San Carlo Borromeo-class ship of the line

== Sources ==
- Anderson, R. C. (1946). "The Unfortunate Voyage of the San Carlo". The Mariner's Mirror. 32 (1): 50–54. doi:10.1080/00253359.1946.10657418.
- Ercole, Guido (2011). Vascelli e fregate della Serenissima: Navi di linea della Marina veneziana 1652-1797 [Ships of the Line and Frigates of the Serenissima: Ships of the Line in the Venetian Navy 1652-1797] (in Italian). Trento: Gruppo Modellistico Trentino. ISBN 978-88-90565-14-4.
- Ercole, Guido (2022). Angelo Emo e Jacopo Nani. I due ammiragli che cercarono di salvare Venezia [Angelo Emo and Jacopo Nani. The Two Admirals Who Tried to Save Venice] (in Italian). Trento: Gruppo Modellistico Trentino. ISBN 978-88-98631-20-9.
