= Venetian ship Europa =

Europa was a first-rank ship of the line of the Venetian navy, serving from 1739 to 1764.

Europa belonged to the third and final batch of the San Lorenzo Zustinian class, representing the largest vessels of the Venetian navy, with some 50 metres (160 ft) total length, a displacement of c. 2000 tons, and armed with 66 cannon (28 × 40-pounders, 28 × 20-pounders, 10 × 14-pounders). Although laid down in 1716, it entered active service only in October 1739, in the meantime being mothballed in the Arsenal of Venice. It remained in service until 1764, when it returned to the Arsenal to be demolished.

== Sources ==
- Ercole, Guido (2011). Vascelli e fregate della Serenissima: Navi di linea della Marina veneziana 1652-1797 [Ships of the Line and Frigates of the Serenissima: Ships of the Line in the Venetian Navy 1652-1797] (in Italian). Trento: Gruppo Modellistico Trentino. ISBN 978-88-90565-14-4.
- Ercole, Guido (2022). Angelo Emo e Jacopo Nani. I due ammiragli che cercarono di salvare Venezia [Angelo Emo and Jacopo Nani. The Two Admirals Who Tried to Save Venice] (in Italian). Trento: Gruppo Modellistico Trentino. ISBN 978-88-98631-20-9.
