= Giove Fulminante-class ship of the line =

Ships

Class overview
- Name: Giove Fulminante
- Builders: Arsenal of Venice
- Operators: (Republic of Venice) Venetian Navy
- Succeeded by: San Lorenzo Zustinian class
- In service: 1667–1709
- Completed: 4

General characteristics
- Type: Ship of the line
- Length: 38.91 m (127 ft 8 in)
- Beam: 13.20 m (43 ft 4 in)
- Draught: 5.99 m (19 ft 8 in)
- Propulsion: Sails
- Armament: 62 guns: Gundeck: 28; Upper gundeck: 28; Quarterdeck: 18

The Giove Fulminante class were the first class of first-rate (Note: Note that by contemporary British practice these ships should be rated as third-rates, but the Venetian Navy considered the class as first-rate vessels. This different classification was never changed for prestige reasons.) ships of the line built by the Venetian Arsenal, from 1666 to 1691, armed with 62 to 68 guns. The fifth ship of the class was extensively modified during construction and became the lead ship of the following San Lorenzo Zustinian class. The last ship of the class was retired in 1709.

== Ships ==
Name	Builder	Construction	Service history	Fate
Giove Fulminante	Venice	1666–1667	Lead ship, took part in the Morean War	Scrapped at the Arsenal starting on 4 October 1693.
Costanza Guerriera	Venice	1666–1667		Lost in a shipwreck at Rapallo, Palermo, on 4 October 1684.
Redentor del Mondo	Venice	1681–1686	Armed with 68 guns, increased to 70 in 1697.	Scrapped at the Arsenal starting on 11 June 1709.
Leon Coronato	Venice	1690–1691	Armed with 68 guns.	Lost to fire at the Battle of the Oinousses Islands on 9 February 1694.

== Bibliography ==
- Candiani, Guido (2009). I vascelli della Serenissima: guerra, politica e costruzioni navali a Venezia in età moderna, 1650-1720 (in Italian). Venice: Istituto Veneto di Scienze, Lettere e Arti.
- Candiani, Guido (2012). Dalla galea alla nave di linea: le trasformazioni della marina veneziana (1572-1699) (in Italian). Novi Ligure: Città del Silenzio.
- Ercole, Guido (2011). Vascelli e fregate della Serenissima (in Italian). Trento: GMT. ISBN 978-8890565144.
- Levi, Cesare Augusto (1896). Navi da guerra costruite nell'Arsenale di Venezia dal 1664 al 1896 (in Italian). Venice: Stabilimento Tipografico F.lli Visentini.
