= San Lorenzo Zustinian-class ship of the line =

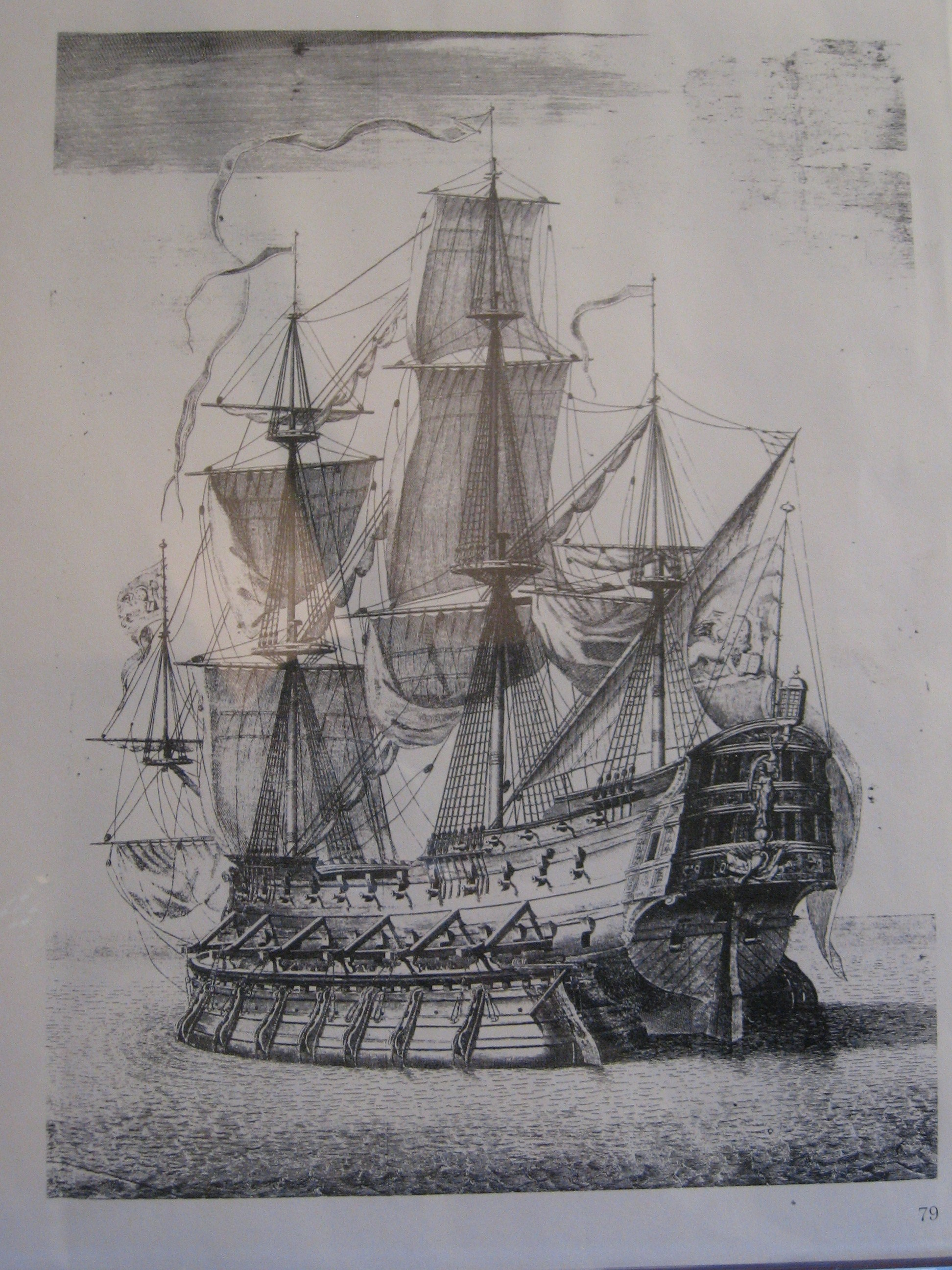
- The ship Aquila Valiera on ship camels

Class overview
- Name: San Lorenzo Zustinian
- Builders: Arsenal of Venice
- Operators: (Republic of Venice) Venetian Navy
- Preceded by: Giove Fulminante class
- Succeeded by: Corona class
- In service: 1691–1746
- Completed: 29

General characteristics
- Type: Ship of the line
- Length: 39.95–42.38 m (131 ft 1 in – 139 ft 1 in) (115–122 Venetian feet)
- Beam: 13.20 m (43 ft 4 in) (38 Ven. ft)
- Draught: 5.75 m (18 ft 10 in) (16.55 Ven. ft)
- Propulsion: Sails
- Armament: 70 guns: (Note: The actual types embarked varied over years, with the last third batch vessels able to carry only 66 guns due to the increased weight of the armament used.); Gundeck: 28; Upper gundeck: 28; Quarterdeck: 12; Forecastle: 2

The San Lorenzo Zustinian class were a class of at least twenty-nine 70-gun third-rate ships of the line built by the Venetian Arsenale from 1691 to 1746, in three different series with minor changes in the ships' length. (Note: Note that by contemporary British practice these 70-gun ships should be rated as third rates, but the Venetian Navy considered the San Lorenzo Zustinian-class first rate vessels. This different classification was never changed for prestige issues.) It was the most numerous class of ship of the line built in Venice, and the last to see active service in a war against the Ottoman Empire in 1718. All this class' ships were planned before 1720, and the vast majority was launched before the Peace of Passarowitz. The last four vessels were completed to 70% in 1720s, then stored in the roofed shipbuilding docks of the Arsenale to be finished and launched between 1739 and 1746, a solution that was widely used with the following Leon Trionfante class.

Those class ships were the first to enter service under the Venetian classification standards, devised by the Ammiraglio dell'Arsenal Stefano Antipa in 1694. In 1696, the Sol d'Oro, a vessel of this class, was the first ship launched with standardized colours in the Venetian sailing fleet.

== Background and design ==
After the losses of the ships San Marco Grande, Sant'Iseppo and Monton d'Oro weakened the Armada Grossa, the Senate decided lo launch two more (Venetian) first rate vessels. Those two ships, ordered in 1690, were intended to be part of the Giove Fulminante-class, and had to copy the waterlines of Costanza Guerriera, built by Iseppo Depieri di Piero some years before. Actually, only the first vessel, the Leon Coronato, built again by Depieri, respected those intentions: the second, baptized San Lorenzo Zustinian, was built by Stefano de Zuanne de Michiel and turned out to be quite different.

Although its design was derived from the previous class, the ship was bigger, having a beam of 38 Venetian feet (13.20 m), a keel length of 115 Ven. feet (39.95 m) and a normal draught of 16.55 Ven. feet (5.75 m). Moreover, it could embark 70 guns instead of 68, carrying at first 4 culverins and 24 20-pounder guns on the gundeck, 4 culverins and 24 14-pounder guns on the upper gundeck, 12 12-pounder guns on the quarterdeck and 2 14-pounder culverins on the forecastle. (Note: Note that the Venetian scale used the libbra sottile (0.301 kg)) Being larger and longer than the Giove Fulminante, the San Lorenzo was more stable, and could also exit from Malamocco with the complete armament on board. For all these reasons, it was considered the first and namesake of a new ship of the line class, the most numerous ever built in the Arsenal.

== Ships ==
=== First batch (1690–94) ===
Ship	Builder	Ordered	Launched	Decommissioned	Fate
San Lorenzo Zustinian	Stefano de Zuanne de Michiel	3 June 1690	11 April 1691	4 August 1712	Pontoon
Stella Maris	Stefano de Zuanne de Michiel	22 May 1692	15 April 1693	9 February 1694	Lost in combat
Iride	Antonio Filetto	9 June 1694	27 August 1695	18 December 1718	Pontoon
San Sebastiàn	Iseppo Depieri di Piero	9 June 1694	29 August 1695	2 September 1697	Lost in combat

=== Second batch (1695–1708) ===
Ship	Builder	Ordered	Launched	Decommissioned	Fate
Aurora	Giacomo Caenon	2 April 1695	4 March 1696	3 October 1709	Broken up
Tigre	Iseppo Depieri di Zuanne	2 April 1695	26 May 1696	7 April 1705	Scuttled
Sol d'Oro	Iseppo Veruda	2 April 1695	26 May 1696	28 November 1705	Broken up
Giove	Zuanne da Venezia	2 April 1695	29 May 1696	18 March 1717	Broken up
Amazzone Guerriera	Iseppo Depieri di Piero	21 April 1696	2 May 1697	19 January 1712	Wrecked
Rizzo d'Oro	Giacomo Caenon	21 April 1696	4 May 1697	15 July 1711	Broken up
Aquila Valiera	Iseppo Depieri di Zuanne	4 May 1697	11 March 1698	7 August 1720	Broken up
Croce Rossa	Zuanne da Venezia	4 May 1697	11 arch 1698	30 November 1715	Wrecked
Colomba d'Oro	Iseppo Depieri di Piero	24 August 1697	23 April 1709	20 March 1727	Pontoon
Grand'Alessandro	Antonio Filetto	24 August 1697	18 August 1709	5 January 1729	Broken up
Costanza	Giacomo Caenon	27 May 1700	29 September 1714	27 November 1745	Broken up
Madonna della Salute	Iseppo Depieri di Zuanne	27 May 1700	23 January 1714	5 January 1740	Broken up
Terror	Zuanne Monello	1707	1 March 1715	17 August 1748	Pontoon
Regina del Mar	Antonio Veruda	28 January 1708	1 March 1715	12 January 1716	Blew up in harbour
San Lorenzo Zustinian II	Giacomo Caenon	28 January 1708	21 June 1715	5 March 1744	Broken up
Trionfo	Zuanne Venturini	28 January 1708	23 June 1715	5 January 1740	Broken up

=== Third batch (1714–1717) ===
Ship	Builder	Ordered	Launched	Decommissioned	Fate
Madonna dell'Arsenal	Giacomo Moro	13 December 1714	22 March 1716	5 January 1740	Broken up
San Gaetano	Zuan Battista de Zorzi	13 December 1714	8 November 1716	12 November 1733	Broken up
San Pio V	Antonio Veruda	13 December 1714	8 November 1716	5 January 1740	Broken up
Gloria Veneta	Zuanne Venturini	13 December 1714	7 February 1717	3 August 1737	Pontoon
Fortuna Guerriera	Antonio Massarini	13 December 1714	14 March 1717	21 May 1740	Broken up
Adria in Pace	Andrea Gallina	Unknown	3 August 1739	9 October 1753	Wrecked
Europa	Zuanne Novello	Unknown	23 October 1739	5 October 1764	Broken up
Sant'Ignazio	Zuanne Novello	13 March 1717	24 July 1744	12 March 1763	Wrecked
Sant'Iseppo	Andrea Gallina	13 March 1717	4 June 1746	5 October 1764	Broken up

== Construction and developments ==
The San Lorenzo Zustinian was built with the traditional "single frame" technique used at the time in the Venetian Arsenal, but with thicker pieces: the main frames were 22 cm thick instead of the 17 cm of the Giove Fulminante-class. This experimental vessel was met with overall applause, and with a decree dated 19 December 1693 the Senate ordered to take her as model for new first rates construction. Stefano de Zuanne de Michiel, its designer and builder, was instructed to build another one with the same measures, that was eventually baptized Stella Maris, and two other vessels were ordered and laid down.

After the Battle of Chios (1694), the Venetian fleet, that lost in the fight two of her four most powerful vessels, the Leon Coronato and the newly built Stella Maris, found herself into a severe shortage of battleship. To answer this issue, the Senate ordered the immediate laying down of four new first rate vessel, built on the measures of the San Lorenzo but able to carry the newly designed 30-pounder guns on the gundeck and 20-pounders on the upper gundeck. To meet these requirements, the ships length was increased to 118 Venetian feet (41.03 m), thus originating the second batch of the San Lorenzo-class. Those ships structures was further strengthened, in order to sustain the stronger concussion of bigger guns, by inserting reinforcement ribbings between the frames under the waterline, a solution originally implemented on the captured Ottoman vessels Sant'Alvise, Santissima Annunziata and San Marco Grande in 1651.

Vessels of this batch were built throughout the following 13 years – the last was ordered in 1708 – and their aging design led to new problems. In the final stages of the Morean War, the San Lorenzo-class vessels, at the time the larger ships in Venetian service, started to embark 50-pounder guns on their gundecks. Moreover, part of those ships, finished in a great hurry during the war, were built with not properly seasoned wood, and deteriorated quickly. The need to sustain the stress of more powerful guns, and the arguments over the resistance of Venetian vessels born out of many cases of hogging in mothballed ships led shipbuilders to reinforce the internal structures of new vessels, and increase their frames thickness to 28.2 cm. The results were evident in the Colomba d'Oro and the Grand'Alessandro: being heavier, they drew more, and turned out to be slow in any wind condition.

To solve this problem, in 1702 Fabio Bonvicini, that had been Capitano Ordinario delle Navi during the war and was now a Senate member, proposed to build longer ships with thicker frames, able to carry 50-pounder guns, with reduced beam and smaller decks height. Only in 1708, winning the opposition of Arsenal's master builders, was laid down a ship that corresponded to Bonvicini suggestion, the Corona, launched in November 1711, but, due to arguments over the danger posed by rough sea to the big first rate ships, it was not replicated.

In the summer of 1714, when the Ottoman-Venetian War of 1714–1718 was about to start, the consistence of the Armata Grossa was reduced to only 22 vessels, mostly second and third rates. To reinforce the naval forces that were about to clash with a 40 vessels strong Ottoman fleet, the works ongoing on the last four vessels of the second batch were accelerated. As those ships were launched, six new first-rates were ordered and laid down in the Arsenal: they were still inspired by the San Lorenzo, but modified according to Bonvicini's notes. Those new vessels, able to carry 50-pounder guns on the gundeck and 30-pounders on the upper gundeck, had a keel length of 122 Venetian feet (42.38 m) and formed the third batch of the class.

== See also ==
- Venetian Navy
- Arsenal of Venice
- Battle of Imbros (1717)
