= Venetian ship Adria in Pace =

Adria in Pace was a first-rank ship of the line of the Venetian navy, serving from 1739 to 1753.

Adria in Pace belonged to the third and final batch of the San Lorenzo Zustinian class, representing the largest vessels of the Venetian navy, with some 50 metres (160 ft) total length, a displacement of c. 2000 tons, and armed with 66 cannon (28 × 40-pounders, 28 × 20-pounders, 10 × 14-pounders). Although laid down in 1716, it entered active service only in August 1739, in the meantime being mothballed in the Arsenal of Venice. It was lost on 9 October 1753, when it ran aground on a shoal off Foça (Focchies), on the western coast of Anatolia. Due to the efforts of the rest of her squadron under Giacomo Nani, the entire crew, and even the ship's cannons and much of its equipment were saved.

== Sources ==
- Ercole, Guido (2011). Vascelli e fregate della Serenissima: Navi di linea della Marina veneziana 1652-1797 [Ships of the Line and Frigates of the Serenissima: Ships of the Line in the Venetian Navy 1652-1797] (in Italian). Trento: Gruppo Modellistico Trentino. ISBN 978-88-90565-14-4.
- Ercole, Guido (2022). Angelo Emo e Jacopo Nani. I due ammiragli che cercarono di salvare Venezia [Angelo Emo and Jacopo Nani. The Two Admirals Who Tried to Save Venice] (in Italian). Trento: Gruppo Modellistico Trentino. ISBN 978-88-98631-20-9.
