= Portuguese ship Nossa Senhora da Conceição (1701) =

Ship of the line of the Portuguese Navy (1701–1724)

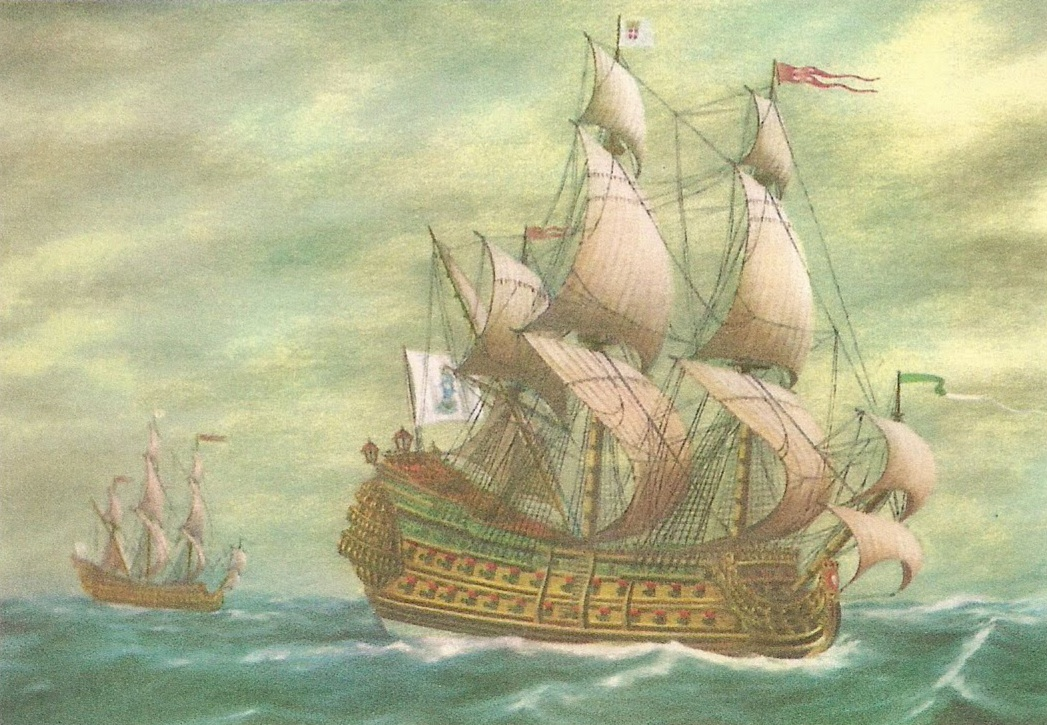

History

Portugal
- Name: Nossa Senhora da Conceição
- Namesake: Our Lady of Conception
- Builder: Ribeira das Naus, Lisbon
- Launched: 1701
- Fate: Last mentioned in 1724

General characteristics
- Type: Ship of the line
- Length: 67 m (219 ft 10 in)
- Beam: 16.5 m (54 ft 2 in)
- Sail plan: Full-rigged ship
- Complement: 700 (1716)
- Armament: 80 guns

Nossa Senhora da Conceição was an 80-gun ship of the line of the Portuguese Navy, built and launched at Lisbon in 1701.

== Service history ==
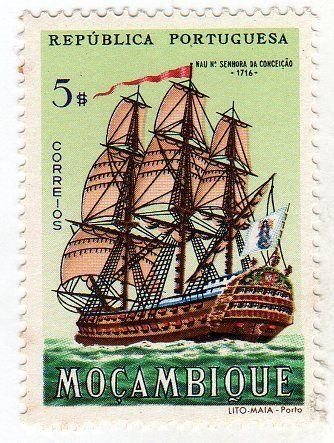
CTT Correios de Portugal's Mozambican postage stamp showing Nossa Senhora da Conceição.

She was built in Lisbon in 1701. In 1716, she took part of a squadron that departed from Lisbon to help Corfu which was under siege by the Ottomans, but when they arrived the siege was already lifted. The next year, at the request of Pope Clement XI, she participated in the Battle of Matapan, during the Ottoman–Venetian War (1714–1718).

In 1716, she had a complement of 700 men. She had a length of 67 metres (219 ft 10 in) and a beam of 16.5 metres (54 ft 2 in).

== Fate ==
Nossa Senhora da Conceição's fate is unknown, it was last mentioned in 1724.
