= Corona-class ship of the line =

Class overview
- Name: Corona
- Builders: Arsenal of Venice
- Operators: (Republic of Venice) Venetian Navy
- Preceded by: San Lorenzo Zustinian class
- Succeeded by: Leon Trionfante class
- In service: 1712–1728
- Completed: 1

General characteristics
- Type: Ship of the line
- Length: 43.46 m (142 ft 7 in) (125 Venetian feet)
- Draft: 6.25 m (20 ft 6 in) (18 Ven. ft)
- Depth: 13.20 m (43 ft 4 in) (38 Ven. ft)
- Propulsion: Sails
- Armament: 76 guns: Gundeck: 28 × 32-pounders; Upper gundeck: 28 × 14-pounders; Quarterdeck: 12 × 9-pounders and 2 × 32-pounder howitzers; Forecastle: 6 × 9-pounders

Corona was a one-member ship of the line class, a 76-gun third rate. It was built in 1712 by the Venetian Arsenal, and was one of the bigger and better armed vessels of the Venetian Navy. Its guns were all made in bronze for prestige reasons. The ship, even if it was a well-made one, was not copied, and the Navy chose to skip to the cheaper Leon Trionfante class instead.

== Notes ==
- The Corona was the only Venetian sailing ship to embark 32-pounder guns, given that the following class' ships had the lighter 27-pounders.

== See also ==
- Venetian Navy
- Arsenal of Venice
- Ottoman-Venetian War (1714-1718)
