= Leon Trionfante-class ship of the line =

1716 class of Venetian third-rate ships

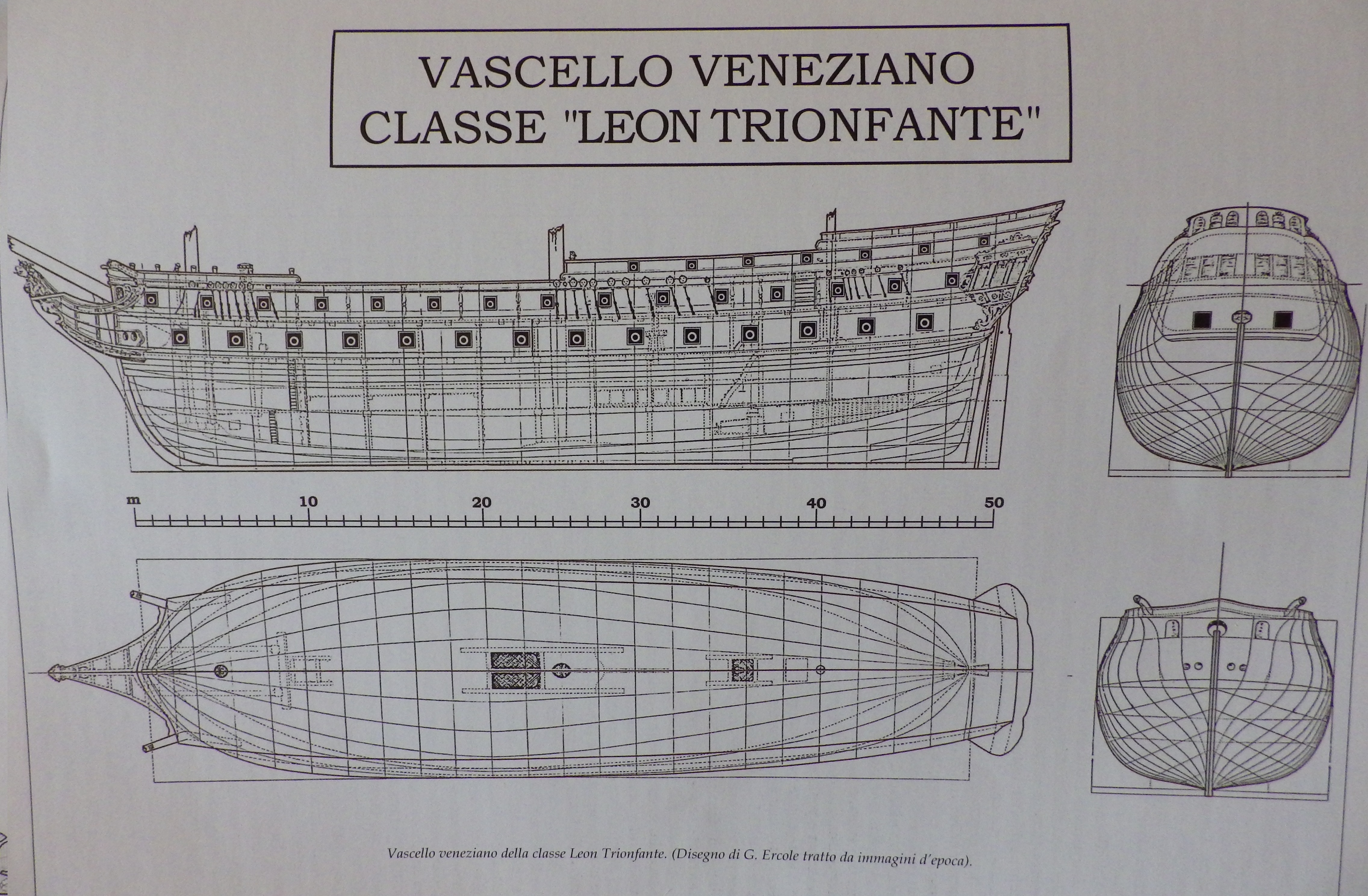
- Reconstruction of a building plan of the Leon Trionfante, modern image based on 18th century images.

Class overview
- Name: Leon Trionfante ("Triumphant Lion")
- Builders: Arsenal of Venice
- Operators: (Republic of Venice) Venetian Navy; French Navy
- Preceded by: Corona class
- Succeeded by: San Carlo Borromeo class
- In service: 1716 - 1797
- Completed: 15
- Lost: 4

General characteristics
- Type: Ship of the line
- Length: 43.11 m (141 ft 5 in) (124 Venetian feet)
- Draft: 6.43 m (21 ft 1 in) (18.5 Ven. ft)
- Depth: 12.85 m (42 ft 2 in) (37 Ven. ft)
- Propulsion: Sails
- Armament: 70 guns: (Note: The guns reported as the main armament of this class' ships are in the Venetian scale, that use the libbra sottile (0,301 kg).); Gundeck: 28 × 40-pounders; Upper gundeck: 28 × 20-pounders; Quarterdeck: 10 × 14-pounders; Forecastle: 4 × 14-pounders

The Leon Trionfante class were a class of at least fourteen 70-gun third-rate ships of the line (Note: Even if by contemporary British practice these 70-gun ships should be rated as third rates, for the Venetian Navy the Leon Trionfante class were first rate vessels. This different classification dated back to the previous century, but Venice never changed it for prestige issues.) built by the Venetian Arsenale from 1716 to 1785, in four different series with minor changes in the ships' length. In 1797, when Venice fell to the French, Napoleon captured several ships of the class, still unfinished in the Arsenal: he chose one of them, forced the shipbuilders to have it completed and added it to his fleet en route for Egypt. After Campoformio, the remaining vessels were destroyed by the French to avoid their capture by the Austrian Empire.

== Design and history ==
The class was conceived and began construction during the Seventh Ottoman-Venetian War, with the lead ship, Leon Trionfante, laid down on 7 March 1716 and being commissioned on 2 May of the same year. The ship was large for its armament: with a keel length of 43.2 metres (142 ft) it rivalled the British 100-gun first-rate HMS Royal William, although with a width of 13.4 metres (44 ft), it was almost 2 metres (6.6 ft) narrower than the Royal William.

Almost all the ships of this class were planned and started before 1739, completed to a 70%, then stored in the roofed shipbuilding docks of the Arsenal of Venice to be finished and launched when the Venetian Navy need them, a solution the British Royal Navy adopted only in 1810, when the docks at Chatham were covered.

This decision, mostly due to the chronic lack of funds of the Republic of Venice in its final years, led to retain in service older and inferior ships than the ones built at the same time for the British Royal Navy and the French Royal Navy. Moreover, contemporary third rates had heavier guns (32-pounders on the gun deck and 18-pounders on the upper gun deck), even if the armament of those ships could be brought up to 72-74 guns. Except for the Leon Trionfante and the Diligenza, none of this class' ships remained in service for more than fifteen years.

== Ships ==
| Name | Designer | Builder | Laid down | Launched | Commissioned | Decommissioned | Fate | Reference |
|---|---|---|---|---|---|---|---|---|
| Leon Trionfante | Unknown | Francesco De Ponti | 1714 | 16 May 1716 | 1716 | Unknown | Dismantled, 1740 | |
| San Giacomo | Unknown | Unknown | 1719 | 29 April 1765 | Unknown | Unknown | Dismantled, 1776 | |

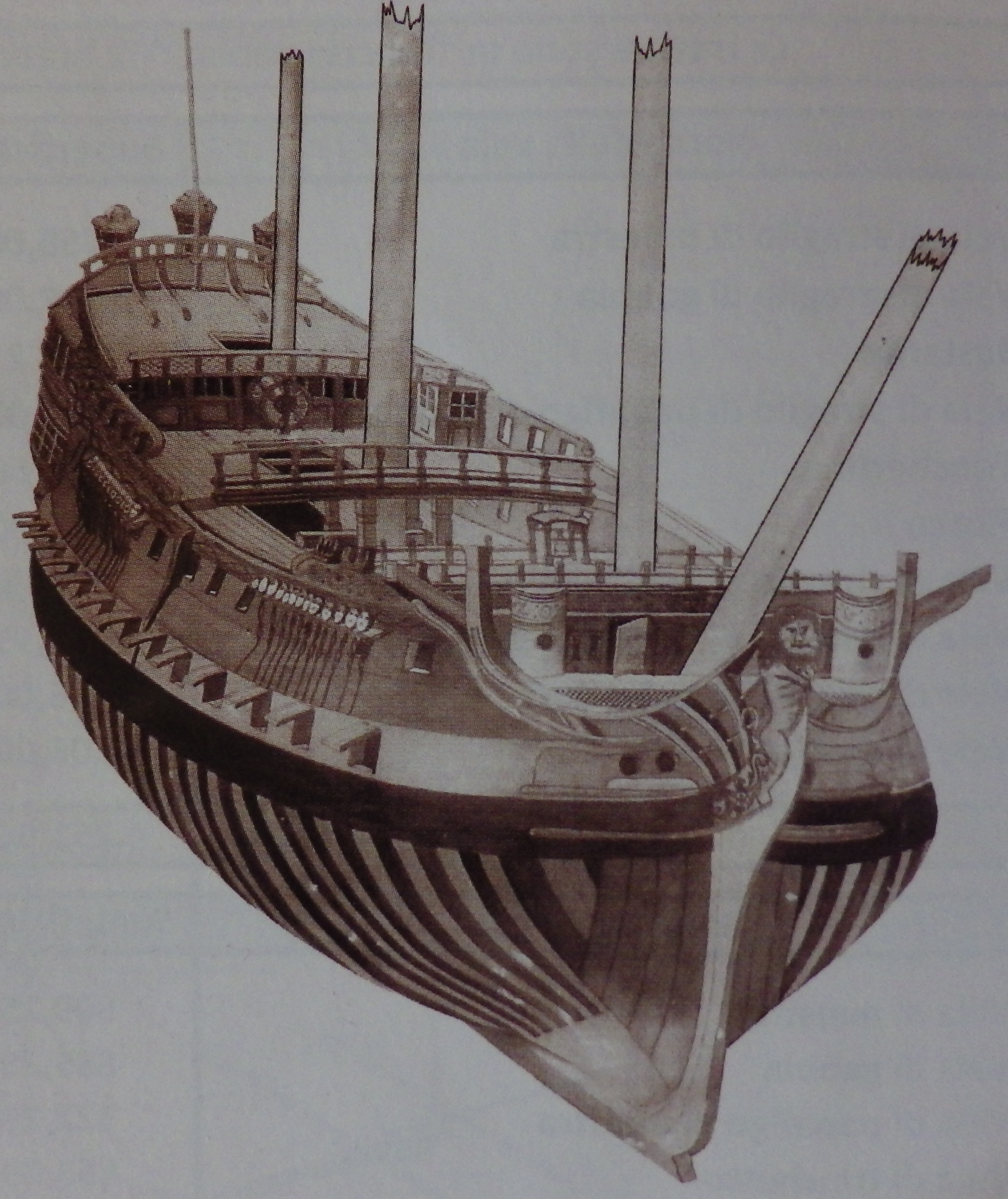
Bow view of a Leon Trionfante

- Buon Consiglio

Ordered: 1719
Launched: 1761
Fate: Broken up, 1776

- Fedeltà

Ordered: 1719
Launched: 1769
Fate: Broken up, 1783

- Forza

Ordered: 1719
Launched: 1774
Fate: Wrecked, 1784

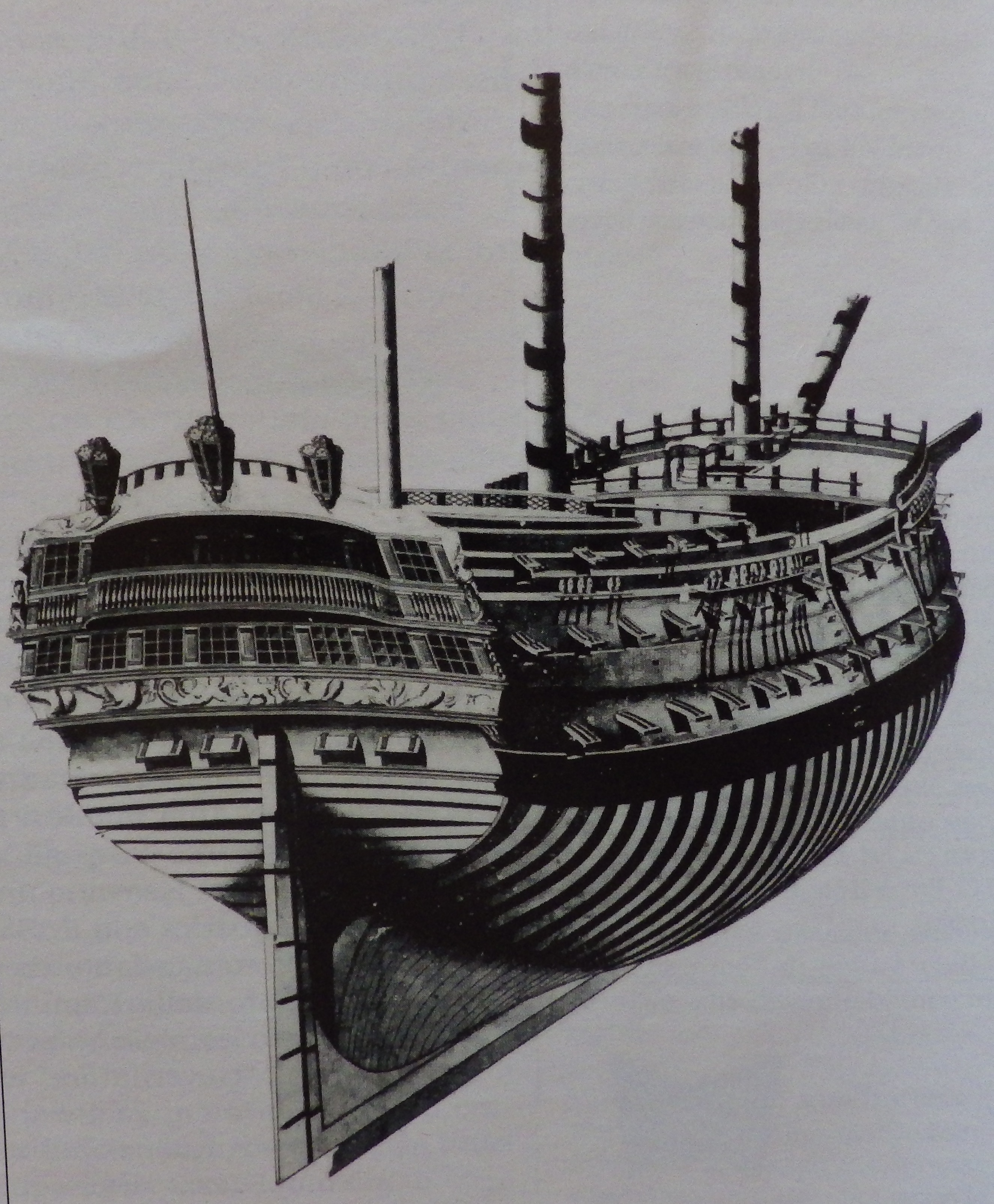
Stern view of a Leon Trionfante

- Corriera Veneta

Ordered: 1722
Launched: 1770
Fate: Wrecked, 1771

- Diligenza

Ordered: 1724
Launched: 1774
Fate: Broken up, 1797

- Fenice

Ordered: 1723
Launched: 1779
Fate: Sunk, 1786

- Galatea

Ordered: 1722
Launched: 1779
Fate: Broken up, 1793

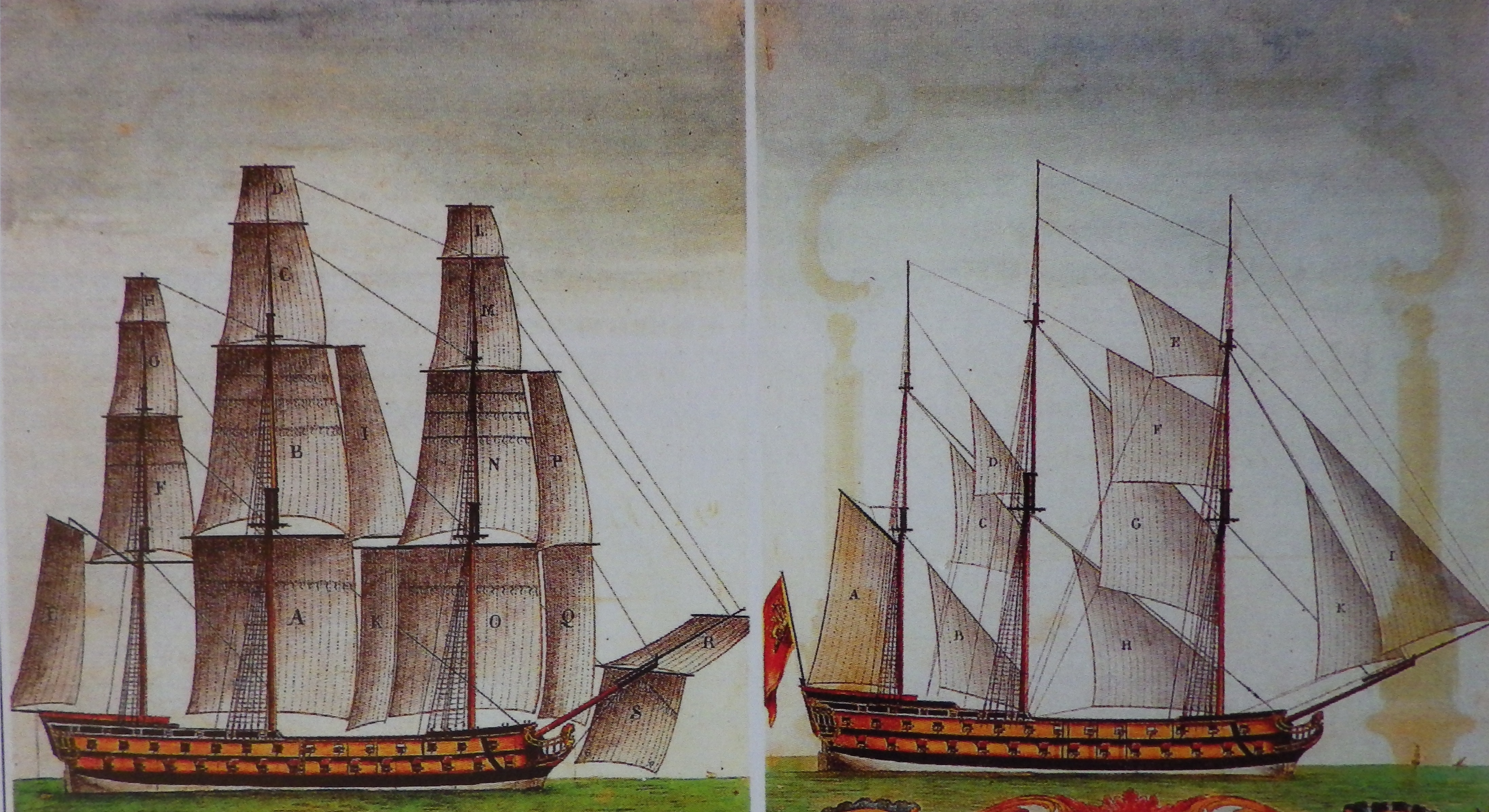
Sail plan of a Leon Trionfante-class ship in 1785. Print by Gianmaria Maffioletti, property of Museo Correr, Venice

- Vittoria

Ordered: 1732
Launched: 1784
Fate: Broken up, 1797

- La Guerriera

Ordered: 1732
Launched: 1785
Fate: Burnt, 1785

- Medea

Ordered: 1732
Launched: 1793
Fate: Captured, 1797

- Eolo

Ordered: 1739
Launched: 1782
Fate: Captured, 1797

- San Giorgio

Ordered: 1736
Launched: 1785
Fate: Captured, 1797

== See also ==
- Venetian Navy
- Arsenal of Venice
- List of sailing ships in Venetian Navy
- Venetian bombardments of the Beylik of Tunis (1784–88)
