= San Carlo Borromeo-class ship of the line =

Class overview
- Name: San Carlo Borromeo
- Builders: Arsenal of Venice
- Operators: (Republic of Venice) Venetian Navy
- Preceded by: Leon Trionfante class
- In service: 1750–1797
- Completed: 2
- Lost: 1

General characteristics
- Type: Ship of the line
- Length: 143 feet 9 inches (43.82 m)
- Beam: 43 feet 4 inches (13.21 m)
- Draft: 19 ft 8 in (5.99 m) (17.25 Ven. ft)
- Depth: 43 ft 4 in (13.20 m) (38 Ven. ft)
- Propulsion: Sails
- Armament: 66 guns: Gundeck: 26 × 40-pounders; Upper gundeck: 28 × 30-pounders; Quarterdeck: 12 × 14-pounders

The San Carlo Borromeo-class ships of the line were a class of two 66-gun third rates built by the Venetian Arsenal from 1750 to 1793.

== Design ==
The San Carlo Borromeo-class ships had a deck length of 147 feet 9 inches (45.03 m), a keel length of 143 feet 9 inches (43.82 m), and were 43 feet 4 inches (13.21 m) wide. Being built to hold 66 guns, by Venetian standards were considered Vascelli di Primo Rango, or first rate ship of the line. By contemporary Royal Navy standards, though, this number would make them third rate ships of the line.

The namesake ship of the class, the San Carlo Borromeo, originally was armed with 28 40-pounds guns on the lower gundeck, 26 20-pounds guns on the upper one and 12 14-pounds guns on the quarterdeck. In 1750 this gave a broadside of 904 Venetian pounds, or 272.1 kilograms (600 lb).

On the Vulcano, launched in 1793, of the 66 guns 26 were 40-pounds cannons, 28 were 30-pounds cannons, and 12 were 14-pounds cannons, located on the lower, upper, and quarterdecks, respectively. This gave a broadside weight of 1024 Venetian pounds, equal to 308 kilograms (679 lb).

The namesake ship, the San Carlo Borromeo, was haunted by a recurring problem: in stormy seas, it had a tendency to lose the rudder. This problem eventually led to its wreck. The only other ship made with the same plans was subsequently modified in 1788 while still in the dockyard, resulting in a great improvement in maneuverability and sailing speed.

This class was prone to the same drawbacks of its contemporary Leon Trionfante class, which affected most of the sailing ships of the Venetian Navy at the time.

== History ==
Little is known of the commanders of either ships, as none took part in important events. It is known, however, that Vulcano was captained by Zuanne Balielo from 30 April 1793 to the end of 1793.

== Ships ==
Name	Designer	Builder	Laid down	Launched	Commissioned	Decommissioned	Fate	Reference
San Carlo Borromeo	Marco Nobile	Unknown	1741	23 February 1747	6 June 1750	Unknown	Sank 21 May 1768	
Vulcano	Marco Nobile	Andrea Chiribiri	1752	1 January 1793	30 April 1793	Unknown	Captured by France on 6 June 1797	

== See also ==
- Venetian navy
