= Lorenzo Marcello =

Venetian admiral

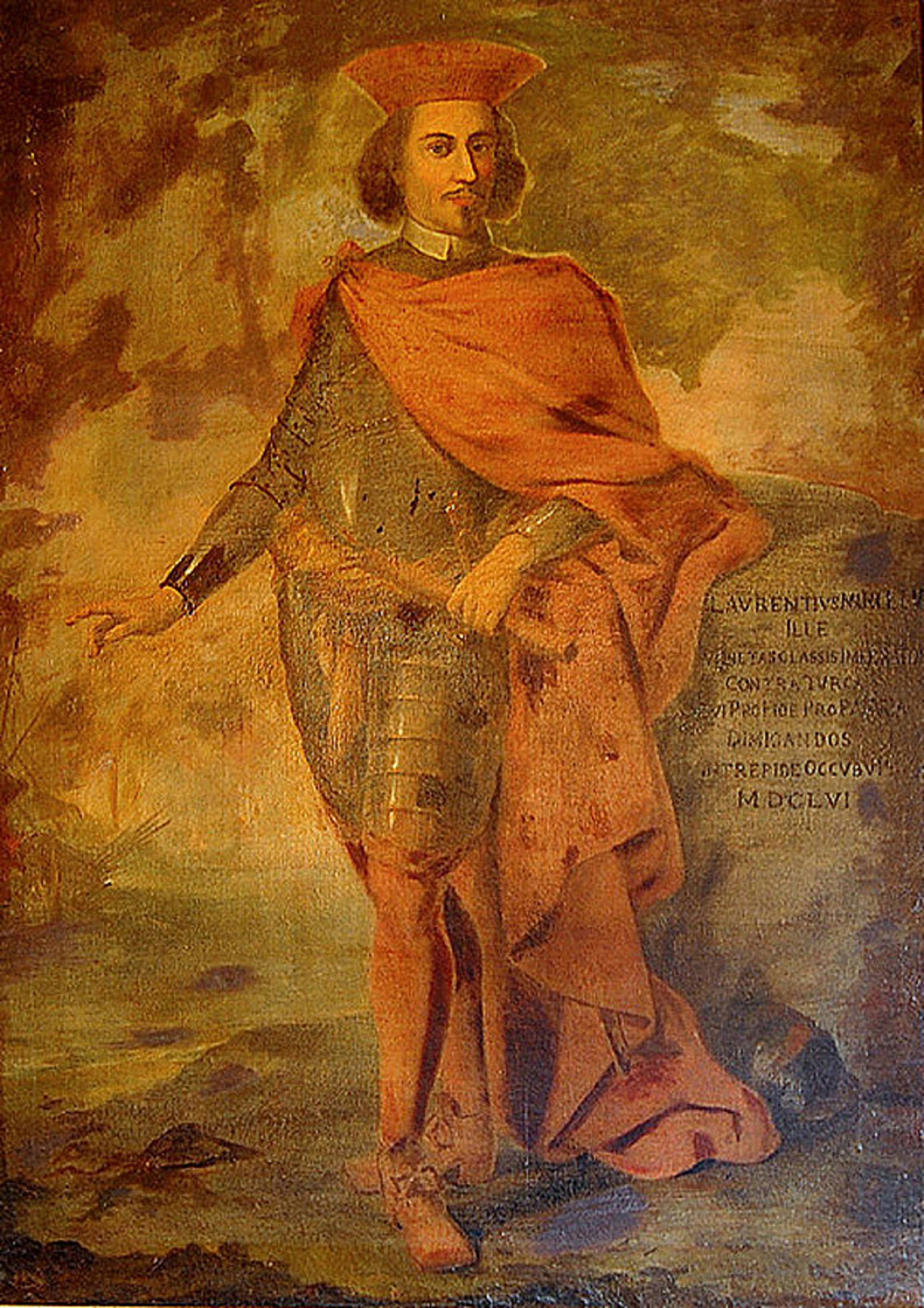
- Born: 1603; Venice, Republic of Venice
- Died: 26 June 1657 (aged 53–54) Dardanelles, Ottoman Empire
- Allegiance: Republic of Venice
- Branch: (Republic of Venice) Venetian Navy
- Rank: Patron all'Arsenale; Provveditore dell'armata Provveditore estraordinario in armata Captain General of the Navy
- Conflicts: Battles of the Dardanelles

Lorenzo Marcello (Venice, 1603 – Dardanelles, 26 June 1656) was a Venetian admiral.

He fought against the Papal Navy in 1642-1644 and subsequently participated in the new Turkish-Venetian War of 1645 to 1669. In September 1655, he succeeded Francesco Morosini as the Venetian Captain General of the Sea. From this position he led the combined Venetian-Maltese fleet in battle in the Dardanelles in June 1656. Although he himself lost his life during the battle, it resulted in the greatest Venetian victory since the Battle of Lepanto in 1571.

== Biography ==
=== Origins and career ===
He was born to Andrea di Iacopo Marcello (branch of San Polo, residing in San Vidal) and Elena di Girolamo Priuli (branch of San Maurizio). He was the fourth of eight children. Of the four males, it was Giacomo (1593 - 1648) who carried on the family's name, by marrying Lucrezia Bembo and producing offspring with her.

Attracted by the sea since his youth, in 1618 he embarked as a "nobleman" in the galley of the Provveditore dell'armata, Antonio Pisani. After a year of apprenticeship, he embraced a career inn the navy: on March 2, 1625, he was appointed captain (sopracomito) of a galley and on May 7, 1628 he was elected patron dell'Arsenale. On 16 June 1630 he was named captain (governatore) of a ship of the line, and undertook his first military jobs escorting merchant ships to Syria and fighting the Turks in the Aegean and the Cyclades. On 30 April 1634 he was appointed captain of the guard of the Kingdom of Candia and led an intense campaign against the pirates who infested this area, driving them out for good. On September 6, 1637, he was further promoted to captain of the galleys.

With this office he took part in the escort of mercantile ships in the eastern Mediterranean and in operations against the Barbary pirates who, in 1638, had devastated the coasts of Apulia. Led by Antonio Marino Cappello, the Venetian fleet had besieged the enemies who had taken refuge in Valona. On this occasion, Marcello, who was fighting under the guns of the batteries of the forts, was wounded in the arm by a shrapnel; nevertheless, he remained in command of his own contingent until victory, earning the praise of the Senate. Back in Venice, his merits earned him, on 24 August 1638, the nomination as censor.

On 3 May 1641 he returned to sea, again as captain of the galleys. On 12 May he became Provveditore dell'armata, the second position after that of captain general of the Sea, and again worked against the Barbary pirates by attacking Senigallia, which they had occupied.

== The war of Candia ==
At the beginning of the war of Candia (23 June 1645), Marcello was still at sea to prevent the arrival of reinforcements towards Chania, occupied by the Turks. These operations continued also in the following winter, however the Venetians needed a drastic and effective offensive intervention. Marcello was one of the most ardent supporters of a strategy of this type, but he did not find a strong following: in addition to the scarcity of resources, there was the problem of the lack of coordination between the commanders, to which was added the excessive prudence of the captain general Giovanni Cappello.

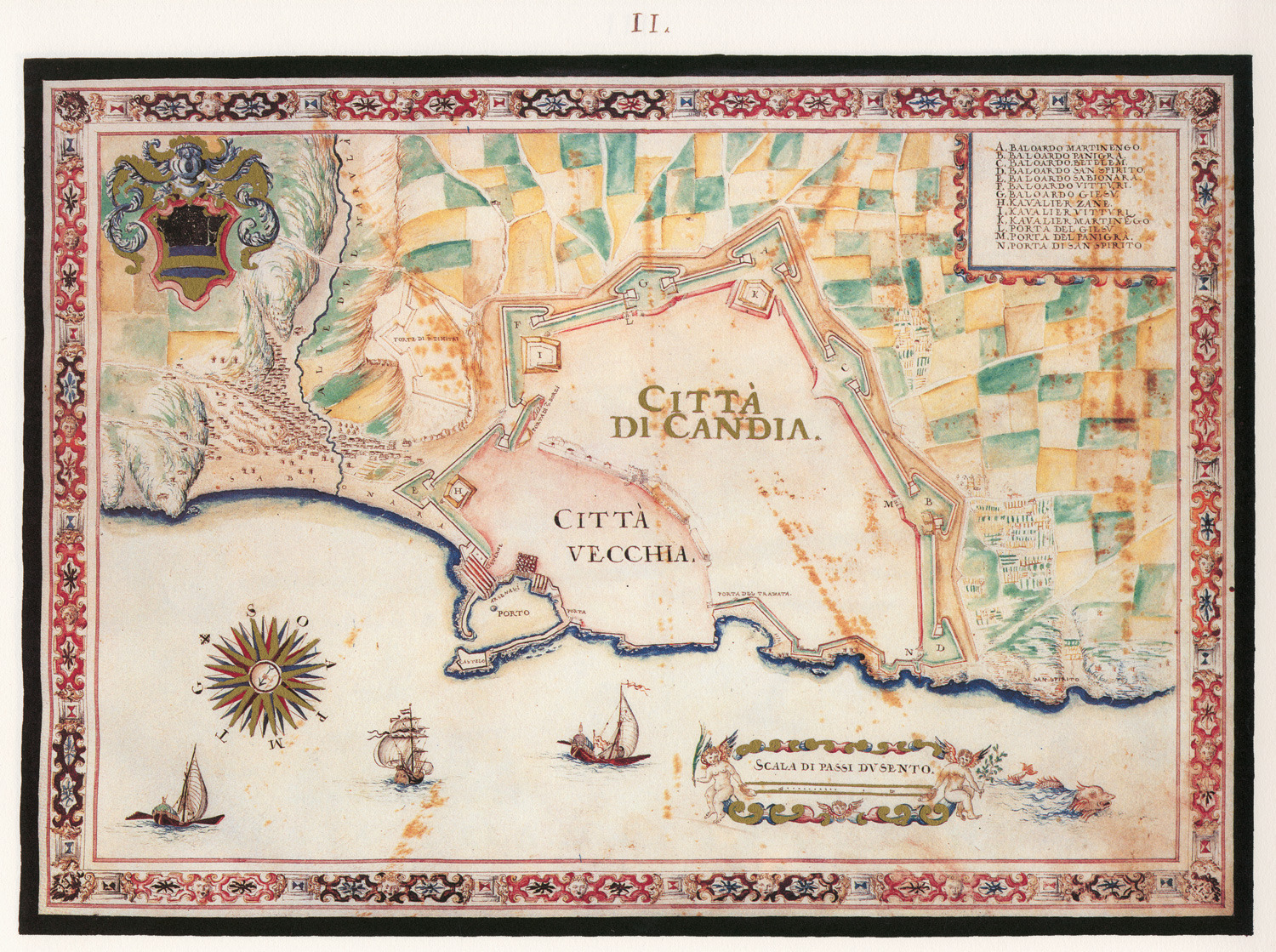
1618 Venetian map of Candia

In May 1647 he chased a group of Ottoman ships that had fled from Chios to Nafplio. Marcello's ships were bombed from the fort of Cisme, but he managed to reach the enemy and captured numerous boats loaded with supplies.

In the spring of 1648 he served in the Ionian and Adriatic, defending the shipping routes; after which he rejoined the rest of the fleet, once again showing his propensity for aggressive strategy. The Venetian government, now closer to his ideas, turned to him to revive the troops (demoralized by the terrible sinking of one hundred and five ships, which had just occurred) and on 9 May 1648 he was appointed "extraordinary administrator in the army" (Provveditore estraordinario in armata).

In the following period, Marcello was the advocate of numerous offensive enterprises (although none had decisive results) and repeatedly asked to remedy the shortcomings and limitations of the Venetian fleet. Meanwhile the operations, already extended from Dalmatia to the Aegean, gradually turned towards the Dardanelles.

Between 1650 and 1655 he spent more time at home, being elected senator four times. On 10 June 1655 he returned to deal directly with the fleet: when Captain General Girolamo Foscarini died, he took his place, immediately clashing with the different orientations of some commanders of the general staff, but was always supported by the government and the esteem of his men.

=== The enterprise of the Dardanelles and death ===
At the beginning of March 1656, Marcello sailed from Candia with an ambitious plan: to destroy the enemy fleet as soon as it had passed the Dardanelles and then retreat to Chania to free it.

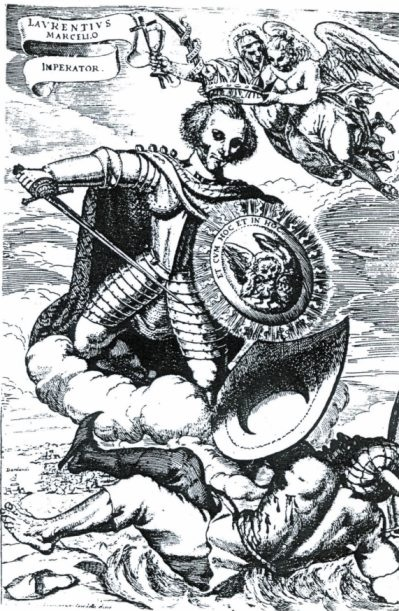
Celebratory depiction of Marcello in the act of crushing a Turk

After having stalled substantially for some time, in April he received the news of an exit of the Turkish fleet from Constantinople; consequently, Marcello headed for the strait, arriving there on May 23 with a fleet of 23 galleys, 7 galleys, 28 sailing ships (or 24 galleys, 6 galleasses, and 13 ships) and smaller ships, which, although not perfectly efficient, counted on trained men and from high morale.

After a further month of waiting, on 23 June the Turkish ships appeared: a hundred units, which shortly after noon on 6 June, taking advantage of the favorable wind, advanced towards the exit of the strait. The Venetians were deployed in three formations arranged in a semicircle, so as to block the entire passage from the European to the Asian coast.

The Turkish ships, protected from the ground by their forts, initially turned to the center of the semicircle, where Marcello himself was. The commander placed himself at the center of the fighting without sparing himself: he was hit by a cannon as he was about to board an enemy ship and died in the arms of his lieutenant Giovanni Marcello, who covered his body so as not to demoralize the crews.

Under the new command of Barbaro Badoer the Venetians achieved tremendous success, with dozens of enemy ships captured or destroyed.

It was Lazzaro Mocenigo who brought news of the victory to his homeland, together with the body of Marcello who, after the state funeral, was buried in the family tomb in San Vidal. The family members received numerous rewards and his brother Girolamo received the title of knight of San Marco.

His inheritance, as reported in his testament of 1652, was enjoyed by some religious and welfare institutions, his serfs and relatives, while the bulk of his patrimony (about 75,000 ducats) went to his great-grandchildren, sons of the favorite nephew Andrea.

== Honours ==
The Italian Navy have named two submarines after him and the name was also given to an Italian liner (1,413 grt, 234 ft. long) built in the 1920s and sunk in 1943.
