= Governatore dei condannati =

Senior Venetian navy commander

The governatore dei condannati ("commander of the convicts") was a senior commander of the navy of the Republic of Venice. The post initially headed the galley squadron manned by convicts and captives rather than free crewmen.

Convicts (condannati) and Muslim captives began to be employed as rowers in the Venetian navy c. 1542, when the first institutions to administer them are also attested. The post of governatore dei condannati was also created at this time. The use of convicts to row the galleys increased over time, except for the flagships and the galeasses. Finally, as the number of galleys in the Venetian fleet diminished in favour of sailing ships of the line, after 1721 all Venetian galleys were exclusively manned by convicts.

Like all squadron commanders of the rowed fleet (armata sottile)—the Provveditore d'Armata, the Capitano delle galeazze, and the Capitano in Golfo—he hoisted his ensign on a bastard galley, with striped red-and-white sails and tents. As his distinctive signs, the flagship of the governatore dei condannati carried a single lantern and the standard of Saint Mark on a plain-topped staff aft, and on the foremast a square ensign of Saint Mark with an egg-shaped tail.

His staff included a chancellor (cancelliere) or a secretary nominated by the Council of Ten, an adjutant (ammiraglio), (Note: The ammiraglio was an experienced naval officer wo combined the functions of adjutant, chief of staff, signals officer and inspector of the squadron; he might also be called upon to lead shore detachments.) a quartermaster (sopramasser), and a standard-bearer. For his personal service he had a head of household (maestro di casa), a steward (scalco), a cook (cuoco), a wine steward (canever), and two orderlies (fanti di pizzuol). In addition he had at his disposal a boat (felucca) with twelve boatsmen (caiccheri) and a rowed frigate with a captain (padrone), two steersmen (timonieri), two artillerymen (bombardieri) and 18 rowers (galeotti).

== Sources ==
- Nani Mocenigo, Mario (1935). Storia della marina veneziana: da Lepanto alla caduta della Repubblica [History of the Venetian navy: from Lepanto to the fall of the Republic] (in Italian). Rome: Tipo lit. Ministero della Marina - Uff. Gabinetto.
