= Palazzo Marcello =

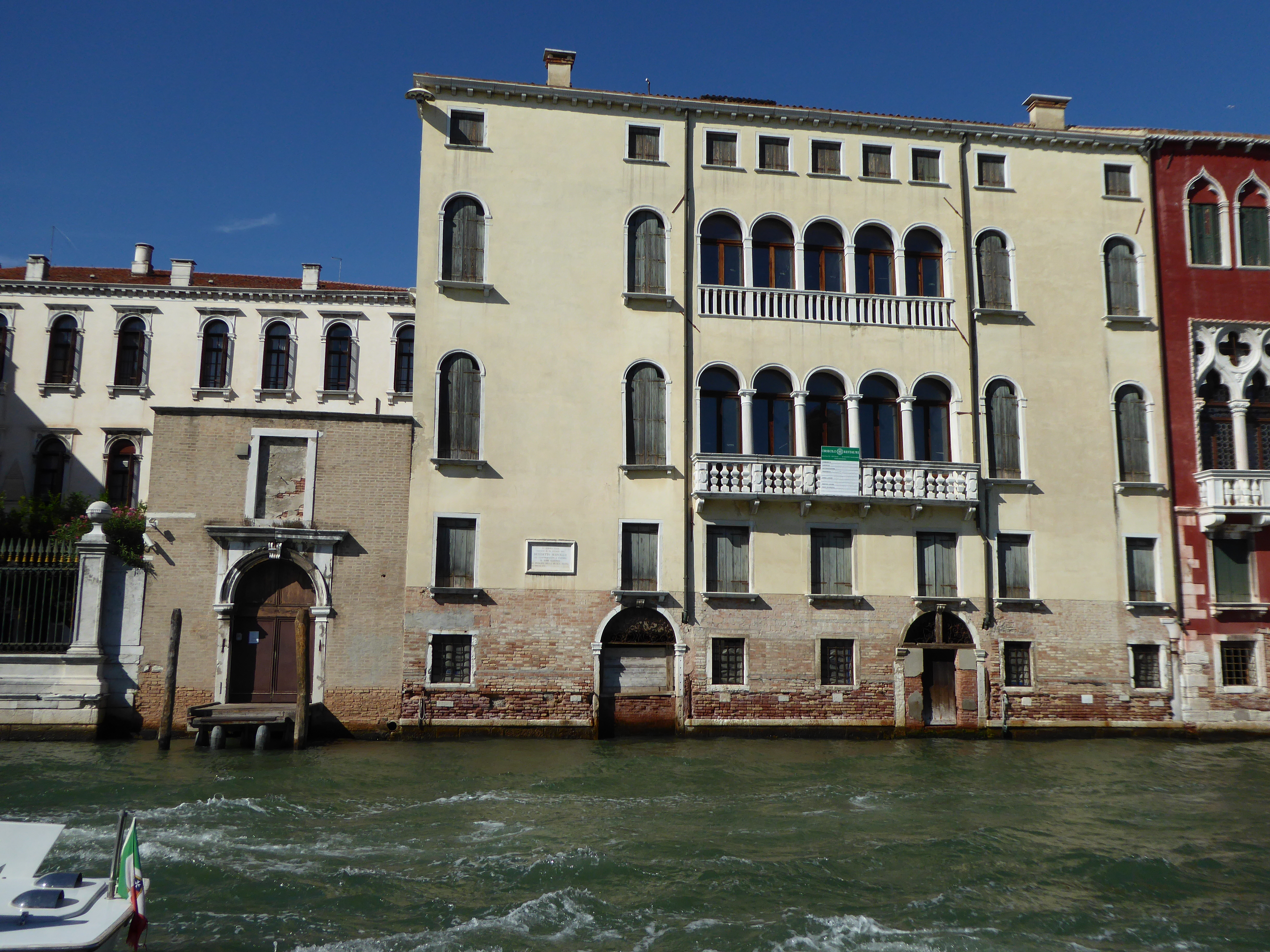
Palazzo Marcello (centre).

Palazzo Marcello is a Renaissance-style palace on the Grand Canal, located between the Palazzo Erizzo alla Maddalena and the Ca' Vendramin Calergi in the sestiere of Cannaregio of Venice, Italy.

The Marcello family obtained this palace in 1485 with the marriage of Gasparo Marcello and Petronilla Crispo. It was refurbished in the 18th century. The musician Benedetto Marcello and the composer Alessandro Marcello were born here. The Duchess de Berry moved here in the middle of the 19th century.
