= Captain of the Gulf =

Senior Venetian naval commander

The Captain of the Gulf (Venetian: Capitan del Golfo; Italian: Capitano in/del Golfo) was a senior naval command of the Republic of Venice.

The post was established around 1330, when a squadron of ships was set up to patrol the "Gulf of Venice" (as the Adriatic Sea was known to the Venetians) and provide protection for commerce there. Neither the squadron nor the post of Captain were permanent in the sense of a modern, standing formation. Every winter, the standing committees of the Great Council of Venice established the annual orders for the so-called "guard fleet", or "fleet of the Gulf". The Great Council then voted on the proposals, the size of the fleet, and the appointment of a Captain of the Gulf and the captains (sopracomiti) for the galleys to be outfitted in Venice. The commanders of the galleys equipped by Venetian colonies were decided by the local colonists. In the 16th century, the Captain of the Gulf, at the head of a squadron that in peacetime numbered 7 to 12 galleys, patrolled the seas around the Venetian Ionian Islands.

In wartime, the Great Council authorized the creation of a fleet under the Captain-General of the Sea, who led the fleet on overseas campaigns, e.g. in the Aegean Sea or the Levant; the Captain of the Gulf and all other naval commanders were then placed under the Captain-General's orders. In battle, the Captain of the Gulf usually commanded one of the wings of the Venetian fleet, or the vanguard.

When the Venetian navy acquired ships of the line in the late 17th century, the Captain of the Gulf remained as one of the senior commanders (Capi da Mar) who led the squadrons of the galley fleet (armata sottile), along with the Provveditore d'Armata, the Capitano delle galeazze and the Governatore dei condannati. Towards the end of the Republic, the Captain of the Gulf had his base at Cattaro. Like all Capi da Mar, he hoisted his ensign on a bastard galley, with striped red-and-white sails and tents. As his distinctive signs, the flagship of the Captain of the Gulf carried a single lantern and the standard of Saint Mark on a plain-topped staff aft, and on the foremast a square ensign of Saint Mark.

His staff included a chancellor (cancelliere) or a secretary nominated by the Council of Ten, an adjutant (ammiraglio), (Note: The ammiraglio was an experienced naval officer who combined the functions of adjutant, chief of staff, signals officer and inspector of the squadron; he might also be called upon to lead shore detachments.) a quartermaster (sopramasser), and a standard-bearer. For his personal service he had a head of household (maestro di casa), a steward (scalco), a cook (cuoco), a wine steward (canever), and two orderlies (fanti di pizzuol). In addition he had at his disposal a boat (felucca) with twelve boatsmen (caiccheri) and a rowed frigate with a captain (padrone), two steersmen (timonieri), two artillerymen (bombardieri) and 18 rowers (galeotti).

== Sources ==
- Arbel, Benjamin (2013). "Venice's Maritime Empire in the Early Modern Period". A Companion to Venetian History, 1400–1797. BRILL. pp. 125–253. ISBN 978-90-04-25252-3.
- Da Mosto, Andrea (1940). L'Archivio di Stato di Venezia. Indice Generale, Storico, Descrittivo ed Analitico. Tomo II: Archivi dell'Amministrazione Provinciale della Repubblica Veneta, archivi delle rappresentanze diplomatiche e consolari, archivi dei governi succeduti alla Repubblica Veneta, archivi degli istituti religiosi e archivi minori (PDF) (in Italian). Rome: Biblioteca d'arte editrice. OCLC 889222113. Archived from the original (PDF) on 2016-03-04.
- Lane, Frederic Chapin (1973). Venice, A Maritime Republic. Baltimore, Maryland: Johns Hopkins University Press. ISBN 0-8018-1445-6.
- Nani Mocenigo, Mario (1935). Storia della marina veneziana: da Lepanto alla caduta della Repubblica [History of the Venetian navy: from Lepanto to the fall of the Republic] (in Italian). Rome: Tipo lit. Ministero della Marina - Uff. Gabinetto.
- Stahl, Alan M. (2009). "Michael of Rhodes: Mariner in Service to Venice". In Long, Pamela O. (ed.). The Book of Michael of Rhodes: A Fifteenth-Century Maritime Manuscript. Volume III: Studies. Cambridge, Massachusetts: MIT Press. pp. 35–98. ISBN 978-0-262-12308-2.
