= Marcello family =

Noble family of Venice

- Coat of Arms of the House of Marcello
- Current region: Italy
- Origin: Ancient Rome (claimed)
- Members: Pietro Marcello, Nicolò Marcello, Lorenzo Marcello, Alessandro Marcello, Benedetto Marcello,
- Connected members: Lucrezia Bembo (by marriage); Elena di Girolamo Priuli (by marriage); Bianca di Francesco Barbarigo (by marriage); Contarina di Donato Contarini (by marriage)
- Distinctions: Doge of Venice
- Estates: Palazzo Marcello; Palazzo Marcello ai Tolentini; Palazzo Moro Marcello; Palazzo Zon Marcello; Villa Marcello (Levada); Villa Marcello (Grollo); Villa Marcello (Fontanelle); Villa Marcello (Sambughè); Villa Marcello (Preganziol)

The Marcello family was a member of the Venetian patriciate.

== History ==
According to the tradition that Venice would be the legitimate heir of ancient Rome, the Marcellos would be direct descendants of the Claudii Marcelli, which would have transplanted into the lagoon during the seventh century; here it would have contributed to the foundation of Rialto, giving tribunes. According to some rumors, in the past they had been called Macigni (or Massi), Storculissi and Scrovoresi.

According to the historical documentation, the first known Marcellos appear in a public deed of 982. The family is originally from Torcello (a Pietro is mentioned, a gastald of the island and judge between the 11th and 12th centuries), but in the second half of the 12th century their transfer to the Realtino archipelago is attested.

The so-called "pseudo-Giustinian" Chronicle (1350s), while recognizing their role in the birth of the Republic, lists them among the families of recent nobility, the so-called curti (those who had been part of the nobility for a short period of time). Nevertheless, from the fourteenth century the Marcellos began to have an important role in Venetian public life, competing with the most prestigious families, the longhi (those who had been part of the nobility since a long time), in the division of offices.

It was above all in the fifteenth century that the family became the protagonist of various political and military events: for example, Jacopo Antonio di Pietro (1397–1464 / 65), who was responsible for the liberation of Brescia and Verona occupied by the Visconti (with the notable enterprise of transporting of a fleet over the Adige by land); Nicolò di Giovanni (1397–1474) who, after a brilliant public career, was elected doge in 1473; Jacopo di Cristoforo (1413–1484), general da mar, who died during the conquest of Gallipoli; Pietro di Jacopo Antonio (1446–1530), who took part in the War of Ferrara (1482–1484), with which the Serenissima subdued Polesine.

Two centuries later it was Lorenzo di Andrea (1603–1656) who distinguished himself in the fight against the Turks, directing the victorious expedition of the Dardanelles, in which, however, he lost his life.

To these are added numerous ecclesiastics and men of culture. The most important were undoubtedly Benedetto (1686–1739), a famous composer of the Baroque period, and his brother Alessandro (1673–1747), himself a composer.

After the fall of the Serenissima, the Marcellos were one of the few Venetian families to maintain a leading role in administrative life. Prominent Marcellos of this period include Alessandro Marcello (politician) (1813–1871), mayor of Venice from 1857 to 1859; Girolamo Marcello (1860–1940), soldier and senator of the Kingdom of Italy; Alessandro Marcello Del Majno (1894–1980), anti-fascist and academic.

== Notable members ==
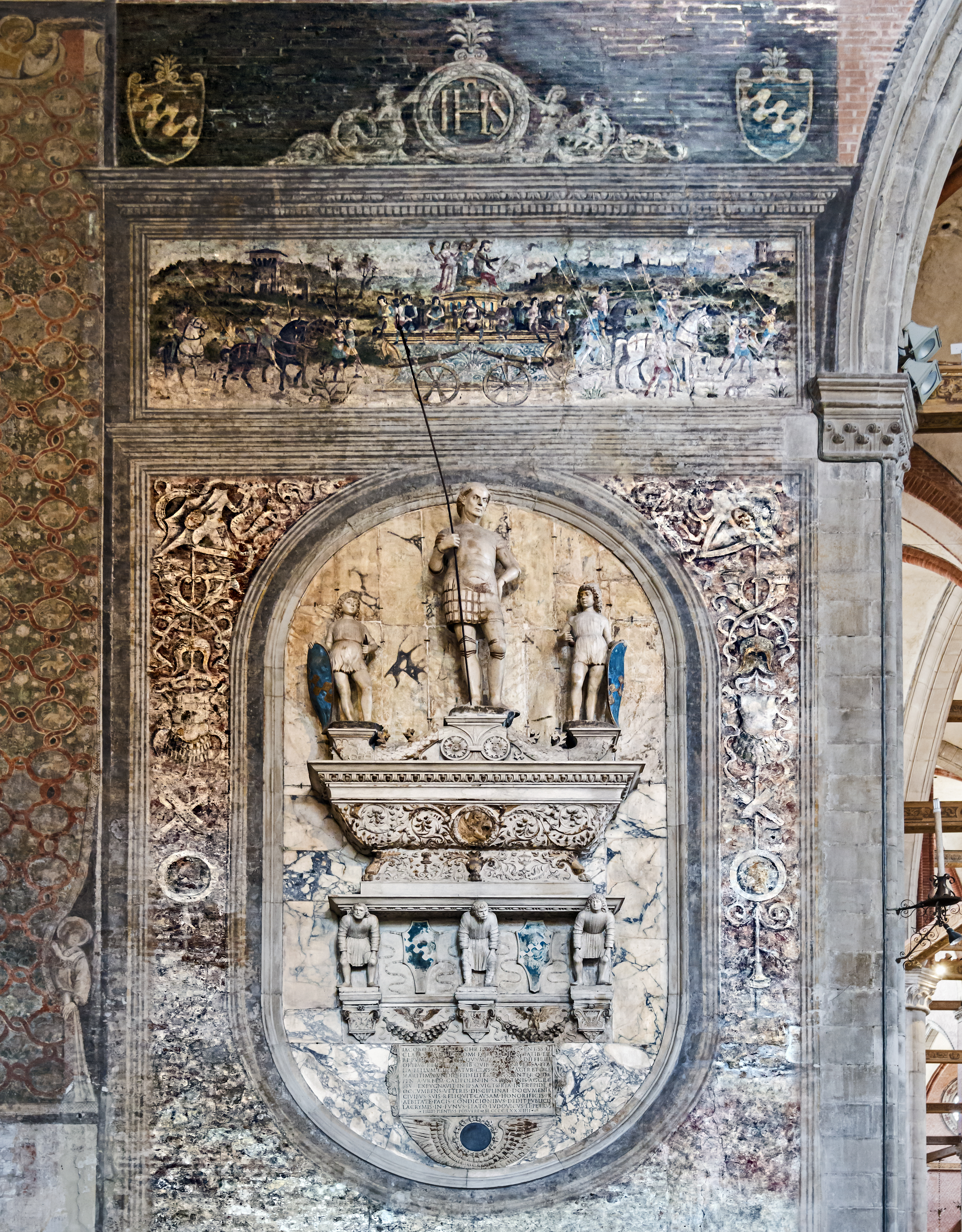
Monument of Jacopo Marcello, Basilica dei Frari

- Pietro Marcello (1376 ca.–1428), bishop and humanist;
- Nicolò Marcello (1397–1474), doge;
- Jacopo Antonio Marcello (1397–1464/65), statesman and military leader;
- Jacopo Marcello (1413–1484), admiral;
- Lorenzo Marcello (1603–1656), admiral;
- Alessandro Marcello (1669–1747), musician and composer;
- Benedetto Marcello (1686–1739), musician and composer;
- Alessandro Marcello (politician) (1813–1871), politician and podestà of Venice from 1857 to 1859;
- Girolamo Marcello (1860–1940), soldier and politician;
- Alessandro Marcello Del Majno (1894–1980), soldier and academician.

== Palaces and villas ==
- Palazzo Marcello ai Tolentini in Venice
- Palazzo Moro Marcello in Venice
- Palazzo Marcello in Cannaregio, Venice
- Palazzo Zon Marcello in Venice
- Villa Marcello (Levada) in Levada di Piombino Dese
- Villa Marcello (Grollo) in Selva del Montello di Volpago del Montello
- Villa Marcello (Fontanelle) in Fontanelle
- Villa Marcello (Sambughè) in Sambughè di Preganziol
- Villa Marcello (Preganziol) in Preganziol
