= Italian ship Lorenzo Marcello =

Lorenzo Marcello or simply Marcello was the name of at least two ships of the Italian Navy named in honour of Lorenzo Marcello and may refer to:

- Italian submarine Lorenzo Marcello, a Micca-class submarine launched in 1918 and discarded in 1928.
- Italian submarine Marcello, a Marcello-class submarine launched in 1937 and sunk in 1941.
