= Palazzo Erizzo alla Maddalena =

Building in Venice, Italy

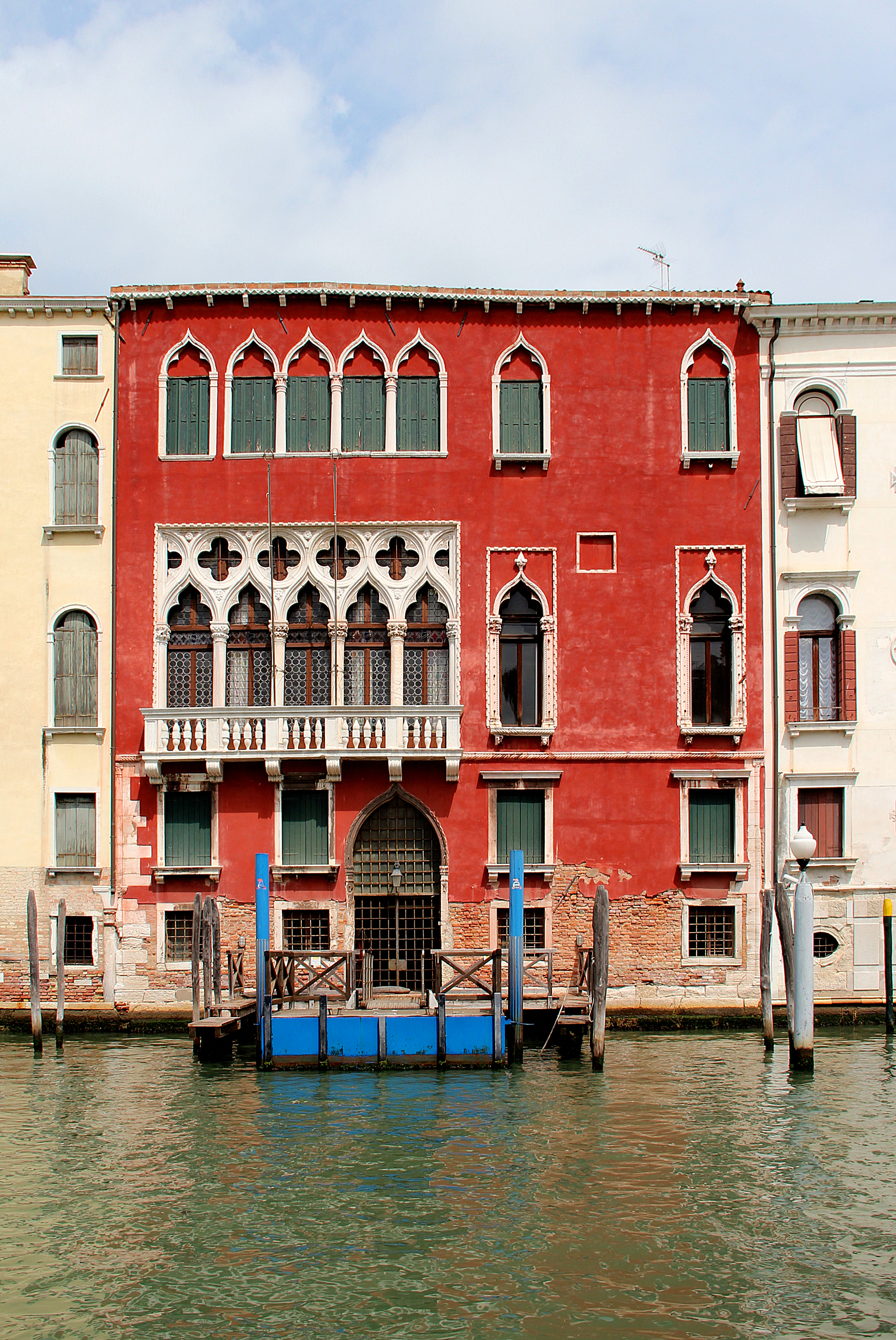
The red Palazzo Erizzo.

Palazzo Erizzo, also known as Palazzo Erizzo alla Maddalena, is a Gothic-style palace on the Canal Grande, located between the Palazzo Marcello and the Palazzo Soranzo Piovene, in the sestiere of Cannaregio, in Venice, Italy. A second Palazzo Erizzo a San Martino is located in the Sestiere of Castello.

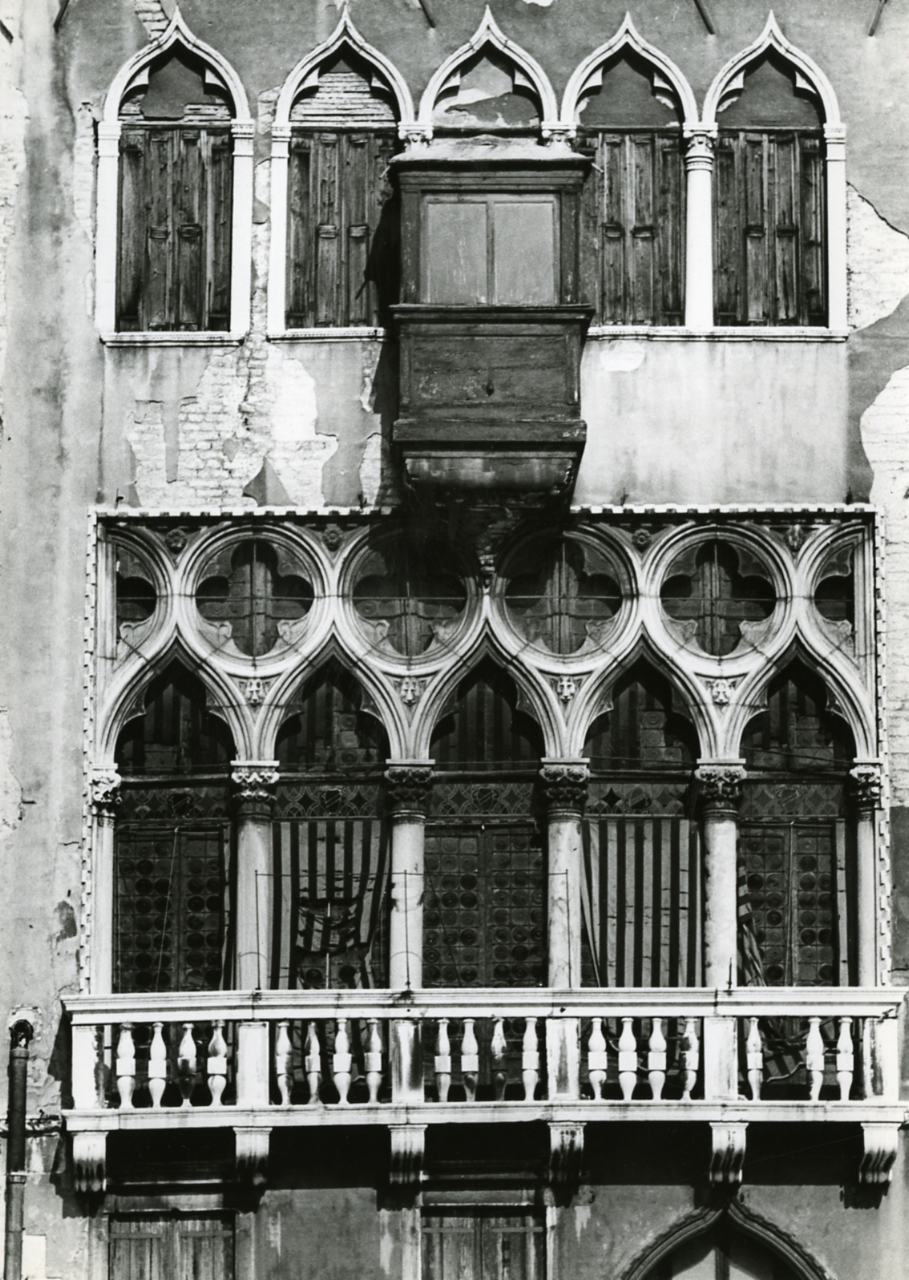
Detail photographed by Paolo Monti, 1969

== History ==
The palace was built initially by the Molin family but came to the Erizzo in 1650 with the marriage of Jacopo Erizzo and Cecilia Molin. The main room was decorated by Andrea Celesti with large paintings depicting the story of Paolo Erizzo, Bailo of Negroponte, who was executed in 1470 by the Sultan Mehmet II.

One member of the Erizzo family, Francesco Erizzo, was doge (1631-1646), and his tomb monument is found in San Martino. The Erizzo family died in 1847 with the death of Guido di Niccolo, but the name was taken up by Francesco Miniscalchi Erizzo, son of Luigi Miniscalchi and Marianna di Andrea Erizzo.
