= Venetian navy =

Naval militants of the Venetian armed forces

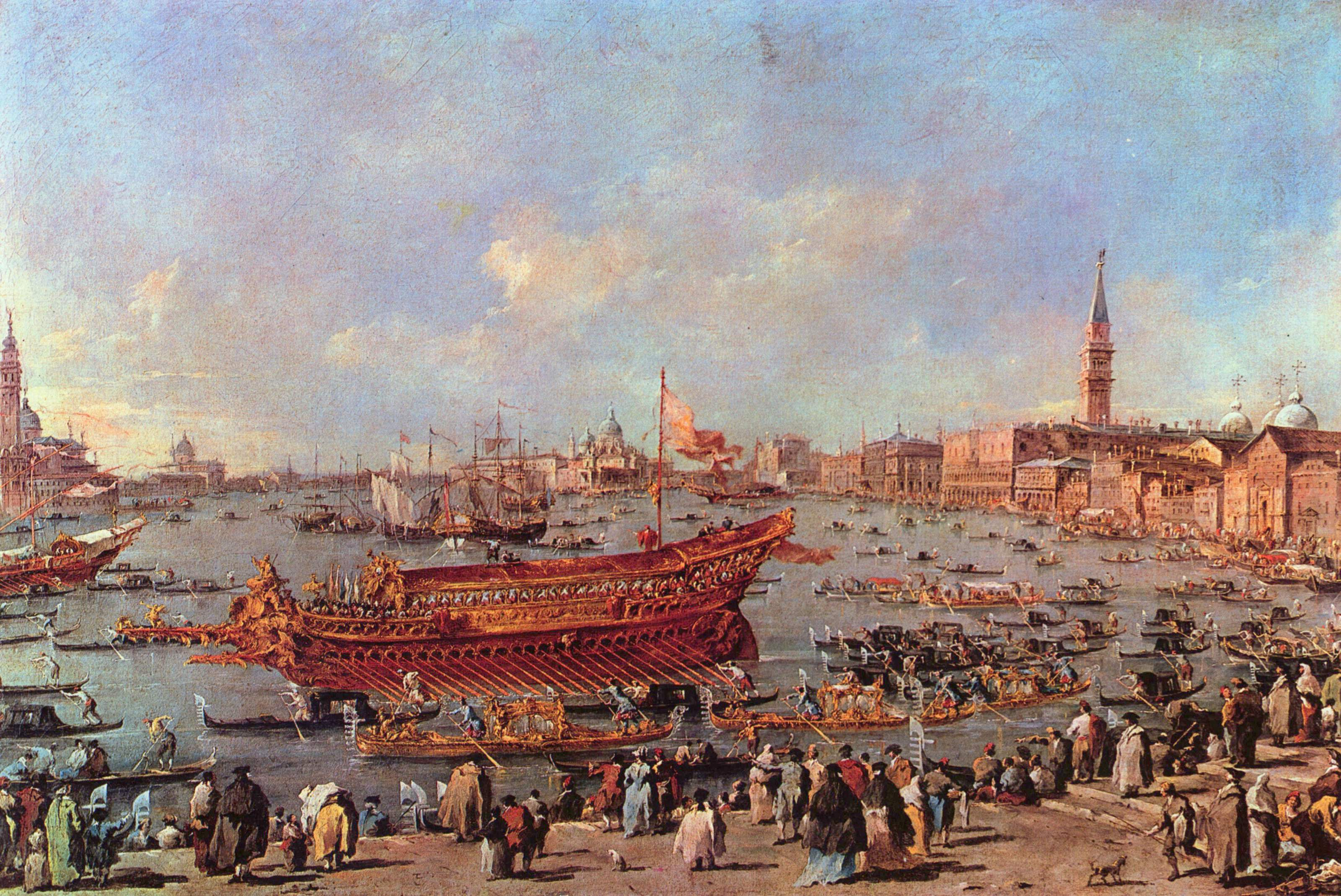
The Doge on the Bucintoro near the Riva di Sant'Elena (c. 1766–70) by Francesco Guardi

The Venetian navy (Venetian: Armada) was the navy of the Venetian Republic which played an important role in the history of the republic and the Mediterranean world. It was the premier navy in the Mediterranean Sea for many centuries between the medieval and early modern periods, providing Venice with control and influence over trade and politics far in excess of the republic's size and population. It was one of the first navies to mount gunpowder weapons aboard ships, and through an organised system of naval dockyards, armouries and chandlers was able to continually keep ships at sea and rapidly replace losses. The Venetian Arsenal was one of the greatest concentrations of industrial capacity prior to the Industrial Revolution and responsible for the bulk of the republic's naval power.

Driven at first by a rivalry with the Byzantine Empire, and later the maritime republics of Pisa and Genoa for primacy over trade with the Levant, the Venetian navy was at times technically innovative and yet operationally conservative. With the final fall of Constantinople it played a key role in checking the maritime advance of the Ottoman Empire for over three centuries. The navy's long decline mirrored that of the republic, beginning in the 16th century and ending with the capitulation of the city to Napoleon in 1797.

== Evolution of the Venetian navy ==
Giving shelter to refugees fleeing Hunnic invaders in the 6th century, Venice grew in the Venetian Lagoon in the northern Adriatic. From the very beginning, it focused on establishing and maintaining maritime trade routes across the Eastern Mediterranean to the Levant and beyond; Venice's commercial and military strength, and continued survival, was founded on the strength of its fleet. This allowed it for centuries to check the maritime advance of the numerically superior forces of the Ottoman Empire.

=== Origins, 8th to 11th centuries ===
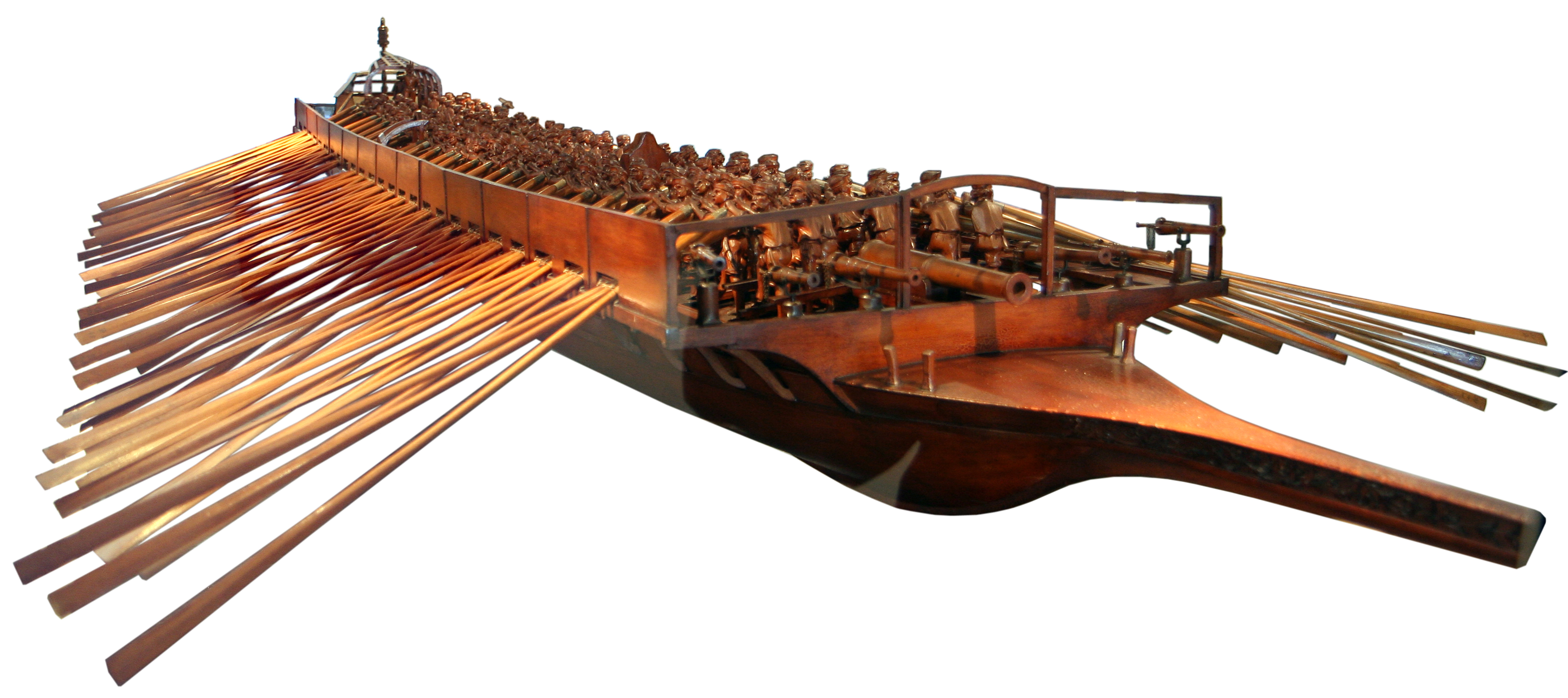
Model of a Venetian galley, Museo Storico Navale, Venice

The origins of the Venetian navy lay in the traditions of the Roman and Byzantine navies. Before developing into the Empire's archnemesis, Venice was originally a vassal, later an ally of the Byzantine Empire and it utilised Byzantine naval and military techniques. At this time there was little difference between the merchant and naval fleets; all ships had to be able to defend themselves if the need arose. In the event of hostilities ships and crews were taken up from trade to reinforce the war fleet, being dispersed back to the pursuit of commerce on the ending of the emergency. Even so, there were two types of vessels one primarily military and one predominantly mercantile.

- The nave sottile (thin ship), a narrow-beamed galley, derived from the trireme, which for a millennium was the principal ship of the Mediterranean. When not in use as warships, galleys were used to transport low bulk high value cargoes.
- The nave tonda (round ship) derived from the Roman navis oneraria (a sail-driven merchant vessel), this was a stubby broad-beamed ship with a high freeboard and multiple decks. It was designed for a profitable transport of cargo. Propelled mainly by the wind, the round ship was limited to sailing before the wind, and were therefore less maneuverable and more vulnerable to enemy attack than oar-propelled vessels. However, in the event of war, they would be used as supply and support ships.

Towards the end of the 9th century there appeared the main instrument of Venetian power:

- The galea sottile (thin galley), an agile narrow-beamed ship with a single deck, propelled as needed by oars or lateen sails. It was an uncomfortable ship as, save perhaps a tent for the officers, the entire crew had to live exposed to the elements, the hold being devoted to supplies and cargo. However, the size of the crew, speed and maneuverability in combat, and the fact that it could sail against the wind or be rowed in the absence of the wind, made it ideal both as a warship and as a transport of the most valuable of cargoes. Length was about 45 metres and the beam 5, provision was made for about 25 banks of rowers.

In addition a number of other types of ships are mentioned in the Chronicles,

- the galandria (or zalandria), a masted galley, with a raised archery platform or "castle"
- the palandria, another type of war galley
- the dromon, similar to contemporary Byzantine ships of the same name, but often larger, they were twin decked and equipped with "castles" and Greek fire projectors, making them useful in maritime sieges
- the gumbaria, mentioned in the time of Pietro II Candiano, a term mostly associated with Muslim heavy warships
- the ippogogo, a cavalry transport (from Greek: ἱππαγωγόν, "horse-carrier")
- the buzo, the great war galley, twin or triple masted, a possible progenitor of the Bucentaur (the state barge of the Doges)
- fireships
- the gatto

With these ships, Venice fought alongside the Byzantines against the Arabs, Franks and Normans, winning by the year 1000 dominance of the Adriatic, subjugating the Narentines and taking control of Dalmatia, the first domain in what would become Venice's Stato da Màr.

Towards the end of this period Venice had accumulated a large and powerful fleet. Although still nominally a vassal of the Byzantine Empire, Venice was increasingly independent and a rival of the Byzantines for primacy in the Eastern Mediterranean. Rather than depending on the Byzantines for their survival, the Venetians held, with their fleet, the balance of power, and was able to use it to leverage concessions from both the Byzantines and their rivals in Western Christendom, profiting from both. In return for Venetian aid against the Normans, in the Byzantine–Norman wars, Alexios I Komnenos the Byzantine Emperor granted the Venetians far-reaching commercial privileges in the Chrysobull, or Golden Bull, of 1082.

=== Twelfth century to first half of the fifteenth century ===
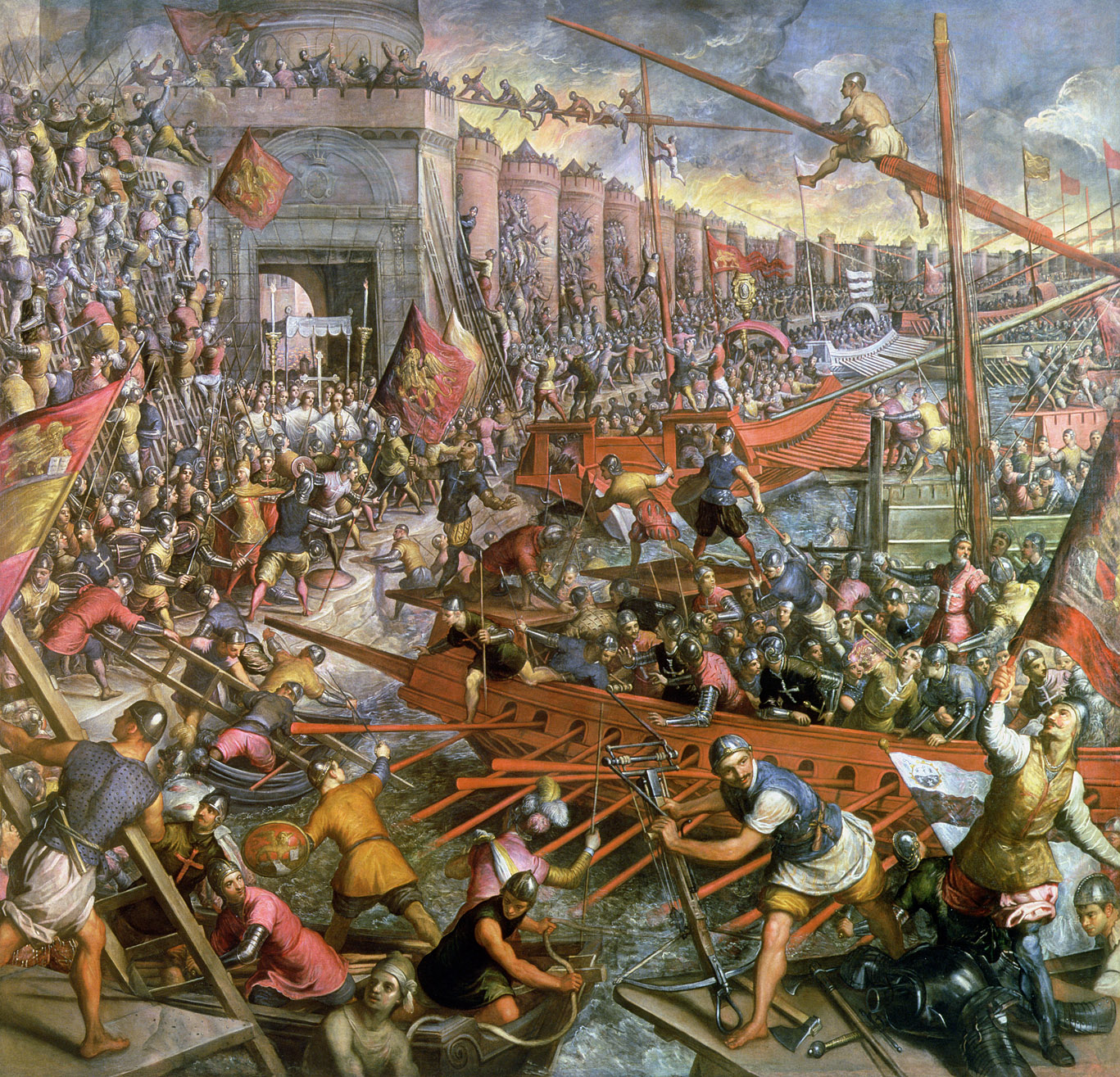
The Capture of Constantinople in 1204, 1580 oil painting by Tintoretto.

In the 12th century, following the Chrysobull of 1082, and the Crusades (for which Venice had provided transport of men and supplies), Venetian commercial interests in the Levant led to the first great revolution of the Venetian navy, the building of the Venetian Arsenal.

At this great public shipyard, under the direct control of the Republic, were concentrated all that was needed to construct and maintain the Venetian fleet. With this move, control of the galleys also passed into public ownership, private citizens being limited to chartering freightage aboard the vessels that undertook the muda trade convoys.

The 13th century opened with overseas conquest and an expansion of the Stato da Màr, giving the Venetian a chain of bases, outposts and colonies across the trade routes to the Levant. Partially at the instigation of Venice, the Fourth Crusade diverted to Constantinople and with the Sack of Constantinople in 1204, Venice had become the pre-eminent maritime power in the Eastern Mediterranean. Venice also developed a new type of galley more suitable for the muda.

- The galea grossa da merchado (great merchant galley), also known simply as the da mercato ("merchantman"); with a greater beam than the previous galea sottile and consequently a reduction in hydrodynamic performance in exchange for enhanced cargo capacity. Essentially a compromise between military and commercial needs the merchant galley was particularly suitable for the trade in high value cargoes with the East. Length was about 50 metres and beam about 7, provision was for 25 banks of rowers.

At this time, the decline of ducal power and an entrenchment of the republican form of government saw the Doge gradually lose the ability to appoint military commanders to the Great Council; the government of the Republic began to take on the shape that it would keep for the following centuries, until its final demise. Additionally, the desire to maintain mastery of newly conquered seas and a growing conflict with the maritime republics of Genoa and Pisa led to Venice keeping a larger fleet under arms for longer.

From 1268, virtually uniquely for the time, Venice maintained a standing fleet so as to maintain control of the Adriatic, which for Venetians was simply il Golfo, the Gulf. With this naval force, Venice imposed its authority on the Adriatic, which it regarded as its own, patrolling, inspecting all ships passing, and attacking those it considered hostile. At the Battle of Curzola in 1298, Venice suffered a major defeat at the hands of the Genoese navy, which saw the loss of 83 galleys out of a fleet of 95, 7,000 men killed and another 7,000 captured. However, Venice was able to immediately equip a second fleet of 100 galleys and was able to obtain reasonable peace conditions that did not significantly hamper its power and prosperity.

The 14th century saw a great change in construction techniques, with the replacement of the twin steering oar for the single stern rudder and with the introduction of the magnetic compass, a radical change in the nature of going out to sea. This century saw the culmination of the long smouldering Venetian–Genoese wars which came to an end of sorts during the War of Chioggia (1378–1381), after which Genoese ships were not seen again in the Adriatic. The Battle of Chioggia, from which the wider conflict takes its name, is notable in being the first recorded use of ship-mounted gunpowder weapons being used in combat. The Venetians, who were already using gunpowder siege weapons on land, mounted small bombards to many of their galleys during the battle to keep the Genoese force cordoned off in Chioggia.

The conflict was nearly equally disastrous for both sides, and Genoa was certainly crippled, losing the naval ascendency that the city-state had enjoyed prior to the war. Venice might have suffered equally as badly, but for the existence of the Arsenal, which allowed Venice to make good its losses in next to no time. By this time the Arsenal had a mothballed fleet of at least 50 decommissioned hulks that could be rearmed and brought rapidly back into service.

Nevertheless, the severe financial strain of the War of Chioggia imposed drastic economies in the post-war, which also affected the navy. Thus, despite the mounting Ottoman threat in the Balkans, the continuing rivalry with Genoa, and the simultaneous expansion of Venetian holdings in the southern Balkans (including Argos and Nauplia, Durazzo, and Monemvasia) the size of the "guard fleet" or "Squadron of the Gulf" mobilized each year was much reduced: instead of the usual ten galleys, in 1385 only four were mobilized, and of these two in Crete rather than Venice, since the colonies were obliged to cover the maintenance of galleys out of their own pockets, rather than the state treasury. This set the pattern for the next decade; when the Senate mobilized ten galleys in 1395, of which only four in Venice, it was considered an extraordinary effort. This was also dictated by the Senate's reluctance to interrupt the peaceful relations with the Ottomans, and thereby also the extremely lucrative trade with the East; even when Venice pledged to support the Crusade of Nicopolis in 1396, this was done half-heartedly, particularly since the crusade was led by the Republic's arch-rival over control of Dalmatia, the King of Hungary. The Turks were well aware of these factors, and sought to placate the Venetians whenever possible so as to dissuade them from allying with the other Christian powers against them.

In the immediate aftermath of the crushing Ottoman victory at Nicopolis, the Venetians instructed the captains of the Squadron of the Gulf to assist beleaguered Constantinople. The Venetian ships were instructed to co-operate with the Genoese fleets operating in the area under Marshal Boucicault, although the customary distrust of the two maritime republics still meant that they pursued their own agendas and eyed each other's military and diplomatic moves warily. Nevertheless, Venice's policy in this period was ambivalent: while it strengthened its overseas garrisons, it avoided an open rupture with the Sultan, and sought to negotiate with him, indeed allowing its local colonies to make their own deals with regional Turkish potentates. As Camillo Manfroni writes, "it was not real war, it was not even peace". This situation was brought to an end by the decisive Ottoman defeat in the Battle of Ankara in July 1402.

The early 15th century saw the spread of a new ship type, developed for use in the North Sea by the Hanseatic League, it then spread to the rest of Europe, and was adopted by Venice for its trade with the North.

- The cog, a "round ship" designed to cope with the rough waters of the North Sea, the hulls of Venetian built cogs had a pronounced teardrop shape, with a narrow bow mounting a high forecastle.

Alongside the naval squadrons that operated at sea, at least from the mid-13th century Venice began to deploy military fleets along the Po. Initially they consisted of a few units, six or seven scaule (small flat-bottomed boats), but during the wars against the duchy of Milan, during the war of Ferrara and up to the battle of Polesella in 1509, the Serenissima operated along the Po and on Lake Garda with real military fleets. In inland waters, the Venetians used galleons, a different type of vessel than the vessel of the same name used at sea. The galleons had a flat bottom, on average between 35 and 40 meters long, and were provided with fortified wooden structures along the sides. Their crew consisted of about fifty sailors, a few dozen crossbowmen and infantrymen and each ship was equipped with at least one bombard. Alongside the galleons, the Venetians also used galleys, which however proved to be unsuitable for river navigation.

=== 1453–1718 ===
The Battle of Lepanto, unknown artist, late 16th century

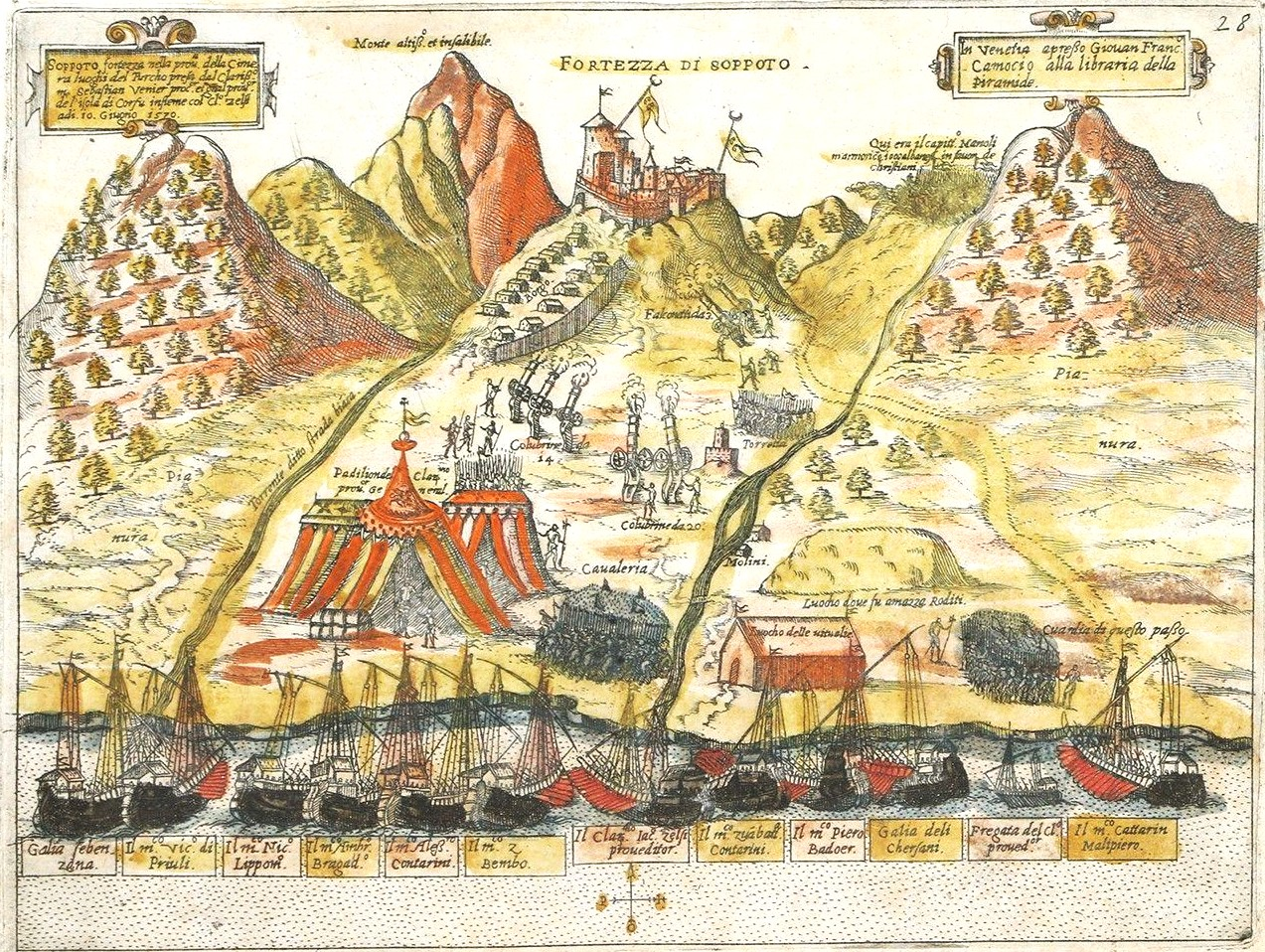
The Venetian fleet at the Siege of Sopot, 27 June 1570

A new chapter for Venice and the Venetian navy opened in 1453, with the Fall of Constantinople and the beginning in earnest of the Ottoman–Venetian wars, a centuries long confrontation with the Ottoman Empire.

Faced with a constant threat to its maritime possessions, Venice had little choice but to maintain a standing fleet of dozens of galleys on a war footing in peacetime, bolstered in times of actual war by over a hundred galleys held in reserve. To oversee the efficient supply and administration of such a force required an extensive organisational effort, leading to the creation of the office of the Magistrato alla milizia da mar "commissioner of naval forces" responsible for the construction and maintenance of ships and cannon, provision of hardtack and other ship's stores, weapons and gunpowder, recruitment of crews and the management of finances.

With the maturation of firearms technology, the previous Greek fire projectors were replaced with cannon positioned in the bow as chasers. This era saw the development of further ship types.

- The Mediterranean brigantine, unrelated to the Northern European brigantine, was a small fast ship, sail- and oar-driven, it was lateen rigged on two masts and had between eight and twelve oars on each side. Like the galley it was used both as an escort and a transport, Venetian brigantines were about 20 metres long and 3 metres wide,
- The galiot, a small galley type ship powered by both oars and sail, also known as the half galley, length was about 25 metres, beam 4 metres and with provision for 15 pairs of oars
- The fusta, a small narrow galley, 35 metres long and 7 metres wide, with provision for 20 banks of oars.
- The galea bastarda "bastard galley", a development of the galea sottile, had a fuller hull and was more strongly built, allowing it to accommodate a fourth, later a fifth, rower per bench, its increased size made it suitable for use as a flagship in both trade and war fleets. It was so named because the vessel was a cross between the galea sottile and the galea grossa.

The 16th century saw the gradual replacement of the traditional missile weapons (bows and crossbows) with the modern arquebus. At this time the traditional Venetian galee libere "free galleys", with crews composed of buonavoglia or free men serving for pay, and zontaroli, debtors and convicts serving out their debt, and conscripts serving in time of war, was supplemented by the first Venetian galee sforzate (lit. 'forced galleys') in which the crews were composed solely of galley slaves, convicts sentenced to forced labour. Unfree rowers were always a rarity in Venice, it being one of few major naval powers that used almost exclusively free rowers, a result of their reliance on alla sensile rowing (one oar per man, with two to three sharing the same bench), which required skilled professional rowers. The use of the galee sforzate was always quite limited in the Venetian navy and did not fit into the normal order of battle of the fleet, instead such ships were formed into a separate flotilla under the command of the so-called Governatore dei condannati "Governor of the condemned".

Making a victorious debut at the Battle of Lepanto in 1571 was a Venetian invention that was soon adopted by other fleets in the Mediterranean. Venetian marines fought in Lepanto, created as Fanti da Mar in 1550., Venice also had dedicated naval expeditionary corps of naval infantry recruited primarily from Dalmatia from the local population called the Oltremarini (overseas troops).

- The galleass was a warship derived from the da mercato, the galleass was a very large galley, carrying a substantial complement of naval artillery on a continuous gun deck, located above the rowers, allowing for the first time the firing of a concentrated broadside. Length was about 50 metres, beam 8 metres, with provision for 25 banks of oars.

The contemporaneous decline in commercial traffic led to the disappearance galea grossa mercantile. By the sixteenth century, Venice, though significant, was no longer the predominant naval power it had once been; the long conflict with the Ottoman's had cut the trade routes to the East, and with the Age of Discovery and the opening of the Atlantic trade routes, the focus of European maritime trade had moved from the Mediterranean.

The 17th century was marked by the loss and the gains of series of overseas possessions; Venice found itself fighting the twenty five year long Cretan War (1645–1669), also known as the "War of Candia", which saw a Venetian expeditionary fleet outside the gates of Istanbul, the former Constantinople, but ended with the loss of Venice's last and most important Eastern Mediterranean possession, the Kingdom of Candia (now Crete). In September 1669, a submarine was proposed with which to attack the Turkish fortifications; however, a peace treaty was signed before it could be constructed.

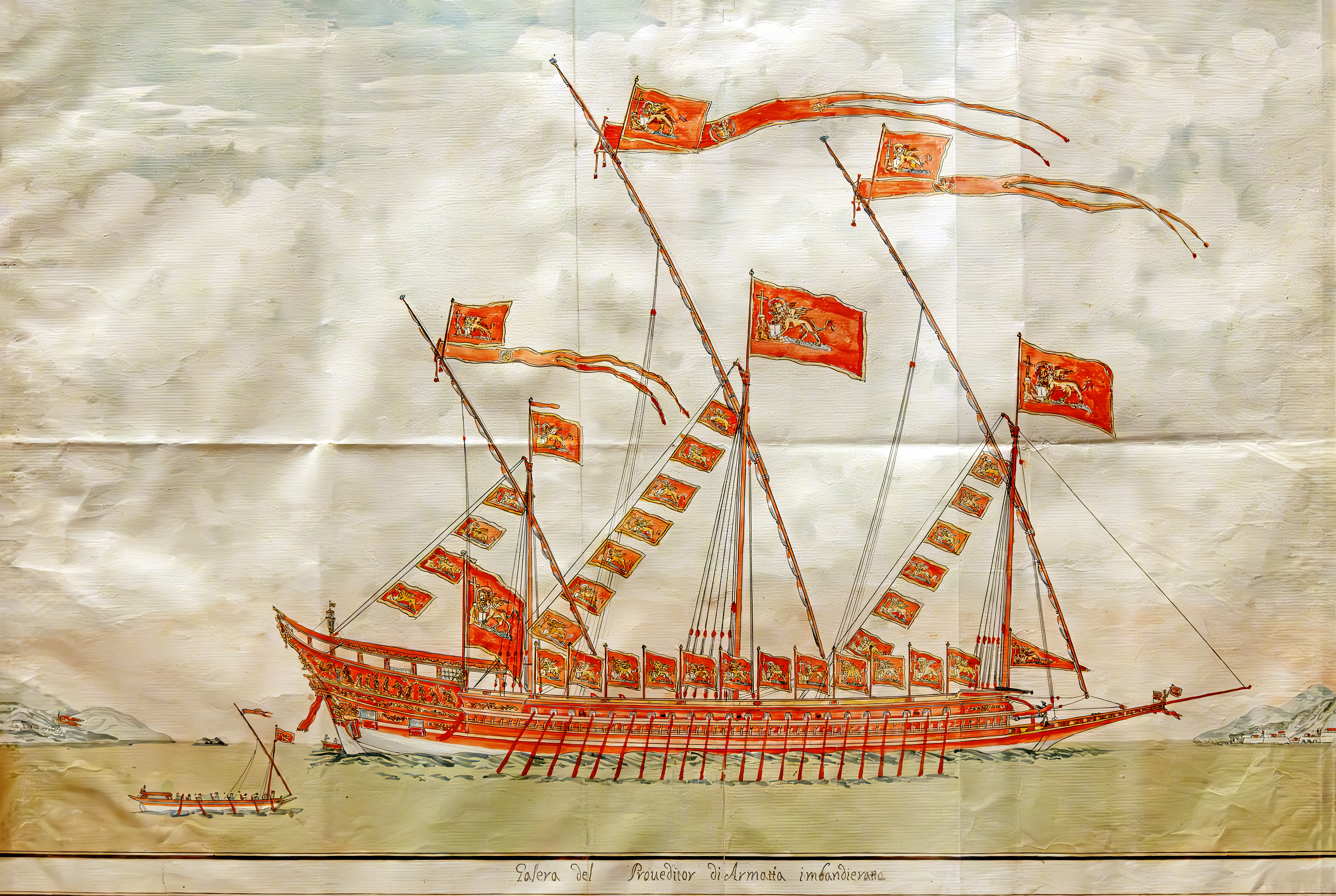
Beflagged galley of a Provveditore d'Armata

In 1619 the Venetian Senate instituted a naval academy, the Collegio dei Giovani Nobili (College for Young Nobles), on the island of Giudecca to provide a naval education.

The Venetian navy continued to introduce and adopt new ship types.

- galea bastardella (barstardling galley), a galley intermediate in size between the galea bastarda and galea sottile
- galleon, the galleon was a Venetian development of a sailing ship (the gallioni), first appearing in the early 16th century and intended to fight piracy, Multi-decked and carrying a broadside of guns on a gun deck the galleon was adopted by other European powers and readopted by Venice. Initially at least it was hybridised by the provision to allow rowing.

==== Adoption of sailing ships ====
The large scale adoption of the galleon by Venice was prompted by her experience with sailing ships chartered from the English and Dutch against the forces of Habsburg Spain and the Ottomans. Its adoption led to a division of the Venetian navy into two, one a sailing branch, the armada grossa (lit. 'heavy fleet'), and the rowing fleet, the armada sottile ('light fleet').

During the 1600s galleys remained an important protagonists in Mediterranean warfare, but they were no longer the decisive weapons they had once been; since the 1500s galleons and other "round ships" (i.e. triple masted sailing ships with a deep draught) had become the most important component of Northern European and other fleets.

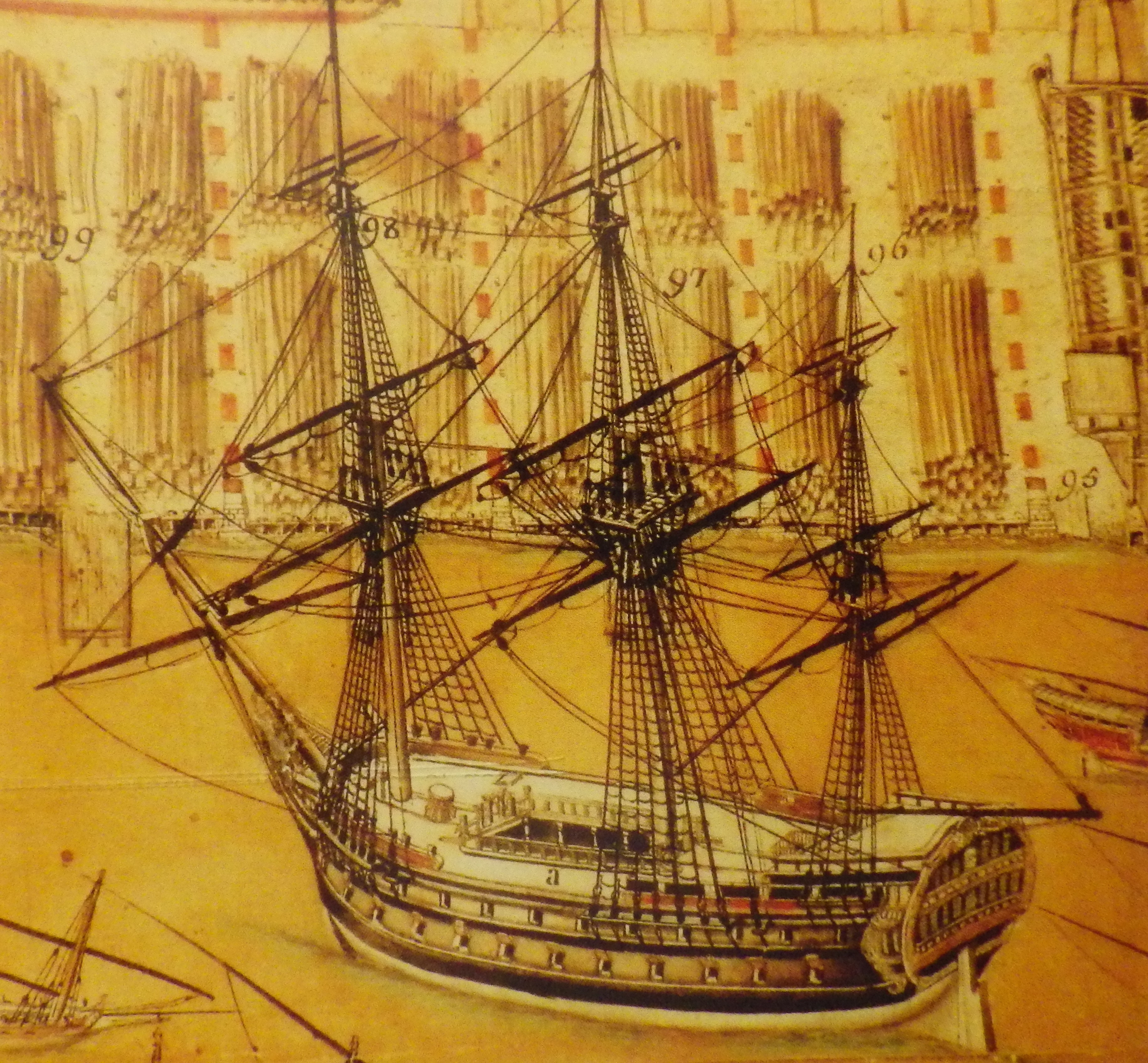
The 70-gun ship of the line Vittoria in the Venetian Arsenal in May 1797, just prior to the fall of the Republic of Venice.

Modern scholars have discerned three phases in the Venetians' adoption of sailing ships. Initially, from the 1617–1620 conflict with Naples to the early phase of the Cretan War, the Republic complemented its galley war fleet with chartered armed merchant vessels. As the domestic merchant fleet was insufficient, the Venetians also chartered foreign vessels, usually Dutch or English. From 1651 on, the Venetians began putting captured Ottoman ships into service. Chartered vessels were still widely used, but the use of the Ottoman ships alleviated some of their drawbacks: the high cost of renting them, and the uncertain availability of foreign ships. The high cost of renting foreign ships, which were not even purpose-built warships, demonstrated the need for a state-owned fleet, a project pressed forward particularly by admiral Lazzaro Mocenigo. His death in 1657 delayed things, but in 1666, the Senate finally ordered the construction of 64-gun ships of the line in the Arsenal.

Construction accelerated in the 1670s, including smaller vessels of the frigate type, driven by increased French presence in the Mediterranean as well as the increase in attacks by the Barbary corsairs, who began operating in squadrons of six to eight vessels. An expansion of the Arsenal also created a large covered shipyard where up to thirteen vessels could be conserved, or worked on, at the same time. This existence of a permanent fleet was a new and distinct advantage over the Ottomans, who did not have a standing sailing fleet, but built their ships as needed, or relied on their Barbary vassals. It was not until 1690 that the Ottomans began building a standing sailing squadron of their own.

=== 1718–1797 ===
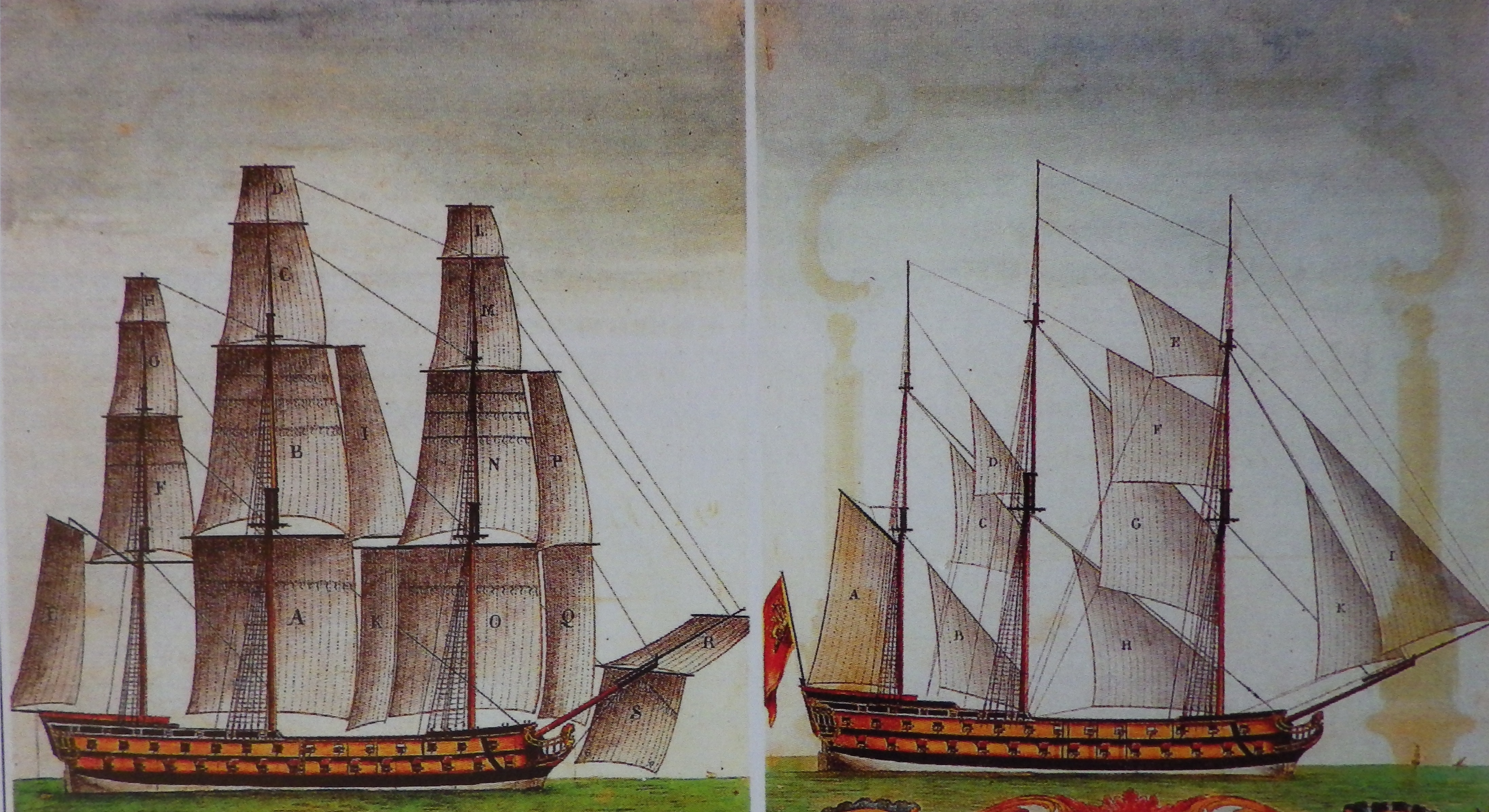
Sail plan of the Leon Trionfante-class ship of the line

During the 18th century, in addition to the introduction of the sextant, the international development of the navy obliged Venice to follow the other European States, competing with them to build new types of sailing ships:

- The frigate, small warship for patrolling
- The ship of the line, a large multi-deck ship armed with dozens of cannons and designed to form the backbone of the fleet.

Following the end of the Seventh Ottoman–Venetian War (1714–1718), Venice was left a minor power. In a sequence of wars lasting almost 75 years, the Republic lost most of its overseas empire and impoverished itself in the process. After the Treaty of Karlowitz in 1718, the Republic enjoyed peace with the Ottoman Empire, but remained in a state of quasi-war with the Ottomans' North African vassals, the Barbary Coast—Ottoman Algeria, Ottoman Tripolitania, Ottoman Tunisia, and Alaouite Morocco—whose raids against Christian shipping continued unabated. The Republic concluded a series of peace agreements with these states in 1763–1765, but these were not honoured for long. This set the stage for the last actions of the Venetian navy, bound up with the name of Angelo Emo.

The end of the Venetian navy coincided with the end of the entire state in 1797, with the arrival of Napoleon's troops. After the fall of the Republic of Venice, the French seized the best warships and plundered the Venetian Arsenal before handing the city over to the Habsburg monarchy of Austria, which got hold of ten ships of the line, seven frigates and corvettes, several dozens of gunboats and small ships, roughly one half of the 1797 fleet.

== Rank and command structure ==
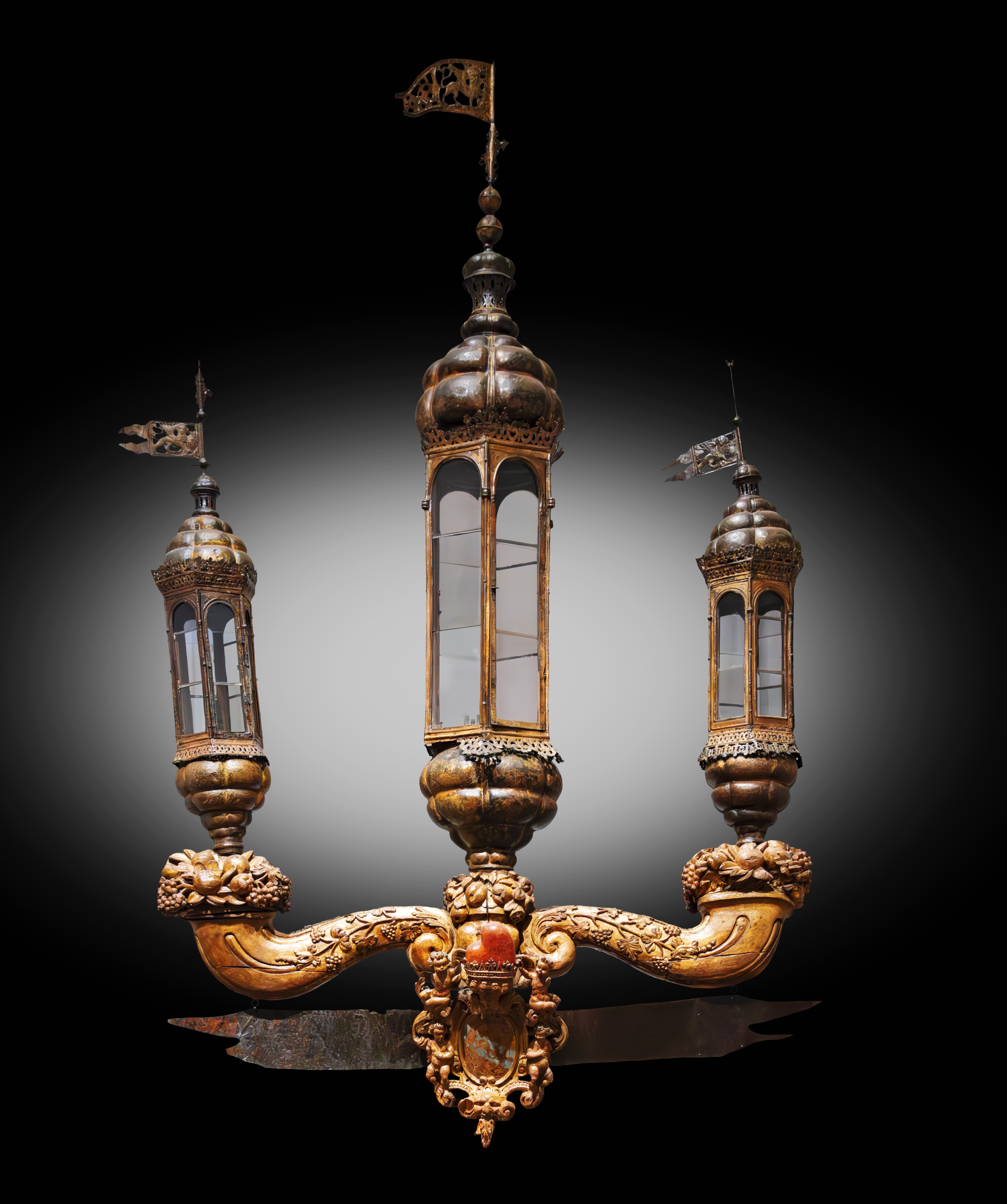
Lanterns, such as this example that belonged to the Captain General Andrea Pisani, were located at the stern of a galley to distinguish flagships in the Venetian galley fleet

The high command of the fleet in peacetime was entrusted to the Provveditore Generale da Mar ('Superintendent-General of the Sea'), who resided at Corfu. In times of war, a Captain General of the Sea (Capitano general da Mar), with extensive powers, was appointed.

Following the division of the fleet in the mid-17th century into a rowed fleet (armata sottile, lit. 'light fleet'), comprising galleys and galeasses, and sailing ships of the line (armata grossa, lit. 'heavy fleet'), the former formed three distinct squadrons, each under the command of the Provveditore d'armata ('Superintendent of the fleet'), the Capitano del Golfo ('Captain of the Gulf'), and the Governatore dei condannati ('Governor of the condemned ones'). The galeasses were sometimes placed under their own commander, the Capitano delle galeazze. The commanders of the ships of the line squadrons were the Capitano delle Navi ('Captain of the Sailing Ships'), the Almirante ('Admiral'), and the Patrona. The Capitano delle Navi was the earliest of the three offices and remained the highest in the sailing squadrons, albeit always under the command of the Capitano general da Mar. As the size of the sailing fleet grew, a second Capitano delle Navi or a Vice Capitano delle Navi were appointed to command the divisions of the sailing fleet, but eventually the more junior ranks of Almirante and Patrona during the Cretan War. For the same reason, an even higher post, that of Capitano Straordinario delle Navi ('Captain Extraordinary of the Sailing Ships') was created during the last Ottoman–Venetian war, but this was a wartime appointment only.

A number of junior and subordinate commanders could be added to these, and a number of temporary or specialized posts were created over the centuries as well, such as the Capitano della Riviera della Marca, the Capitano delle fuste in Golfo ('Captain of the light galleys in the Gulf'), the capitani of bastard galleys and heavy galleys, the Capitano contro Uscocchi ('Captain against the Uskoks') and the Capitano alla guardia delle isole del Quarnero e delle Rive dell’Istria ('Captain on the watch of the islands of Quarnero and the Coasts of Istria'). In the 15th and 16th centuries, Venice also maintained riverine fleets in the Po and Adige, as well as in Lake Garda in the 17th century. The overseas colonies of Crete and Cyprus also had their own fleet squadrons, under a Capitano della Guardia.

Individual galleys were commanded by a sopracomito, galeasses by a governatore, and the ships of the line by a governatore di nave, or nobile di nave. Like the higher command positions and the senior commissariat of the fleet, all of them were filled by members of the Venetian patriciate.

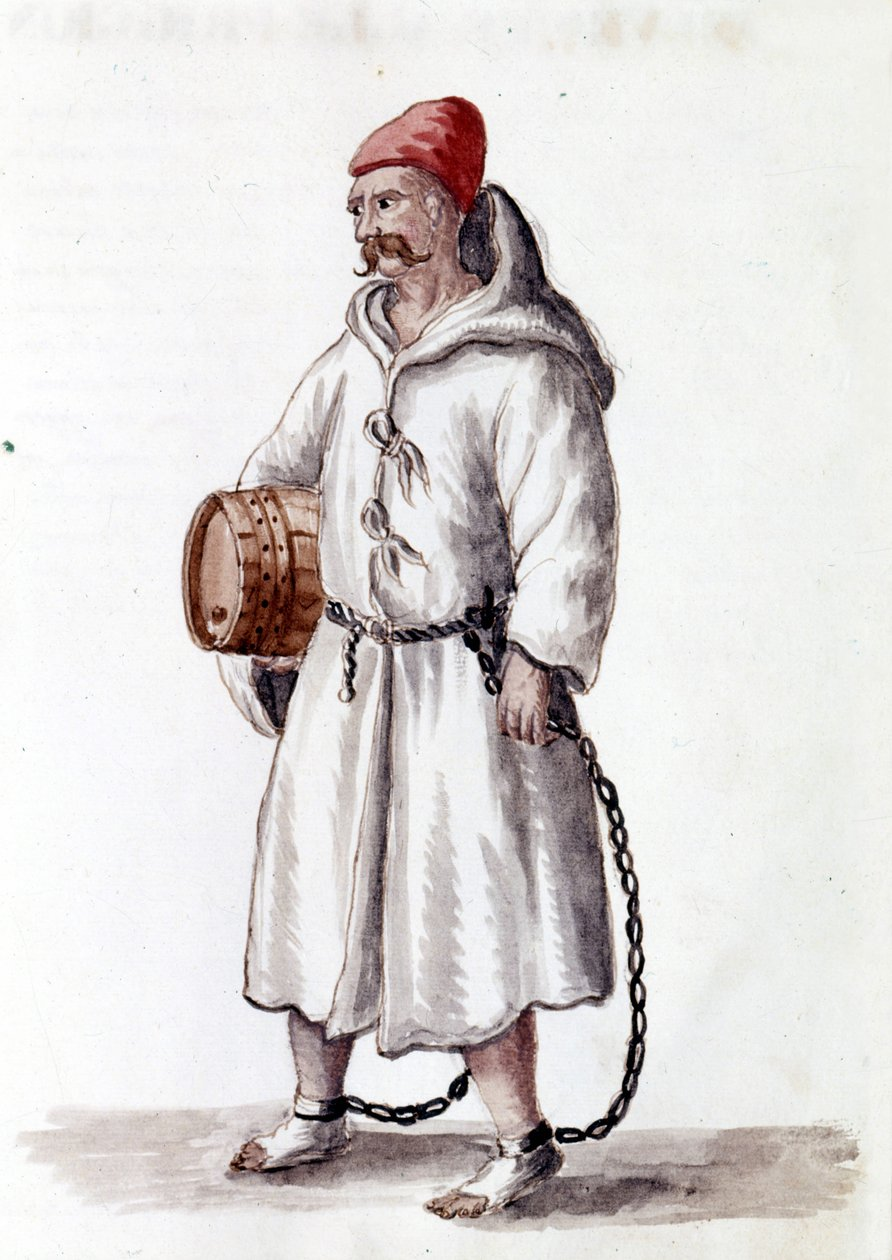
Galley slave of the Venetian navy

Schiavoni or Oltramarini - Dalmatian marines, 18th century

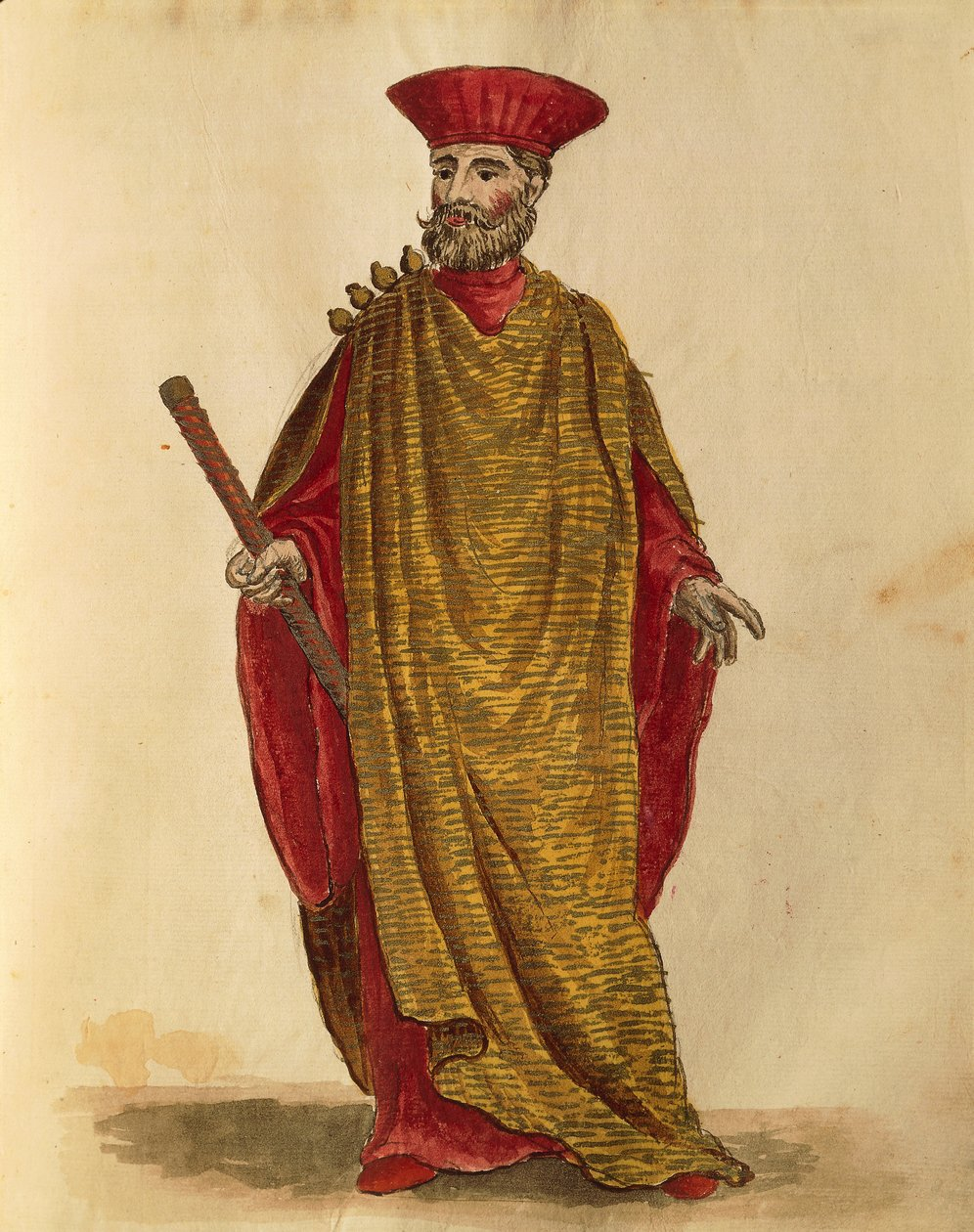
Captain General of the Sea in traditional ceremonial dress

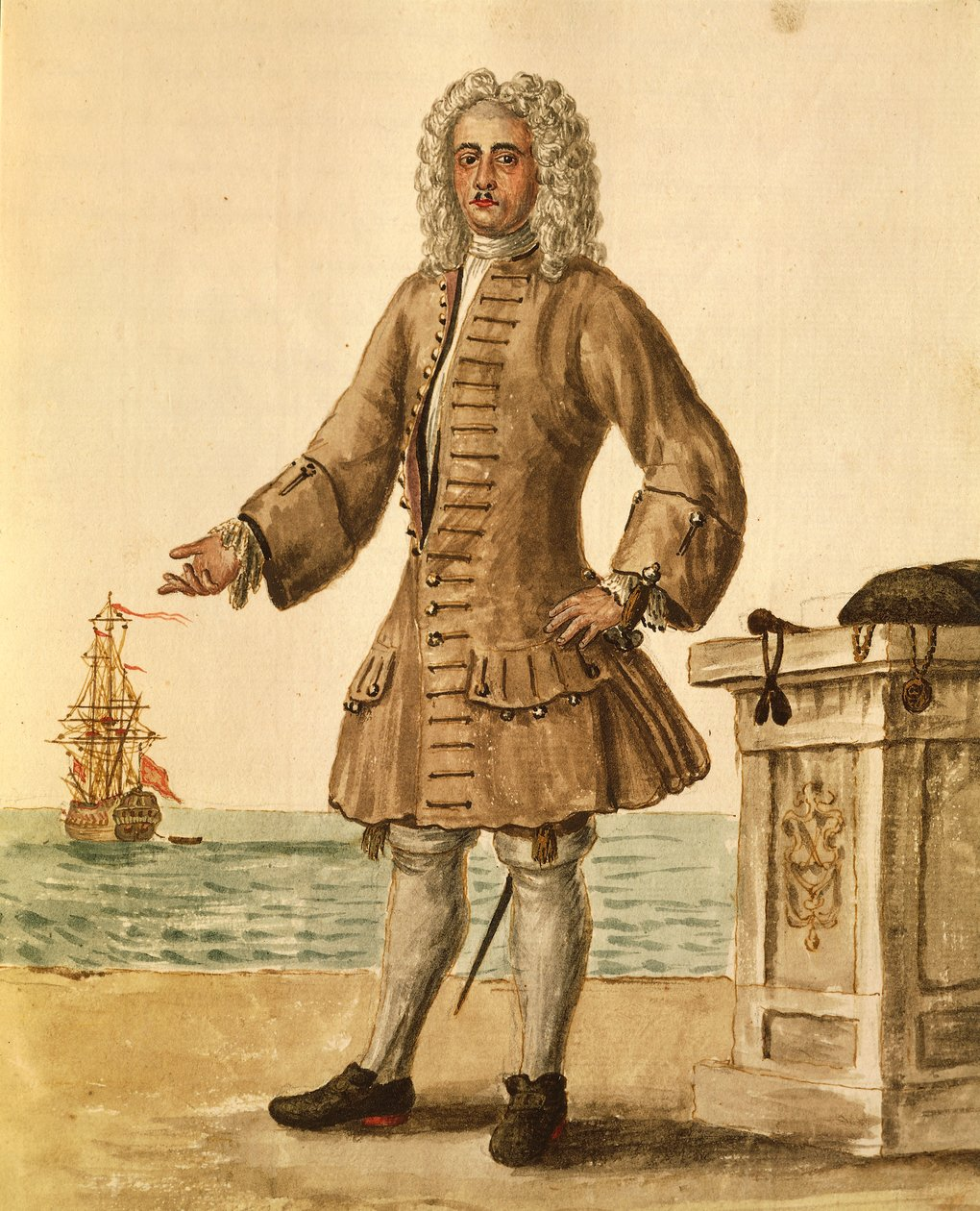
A nobile di nave, early 18th century

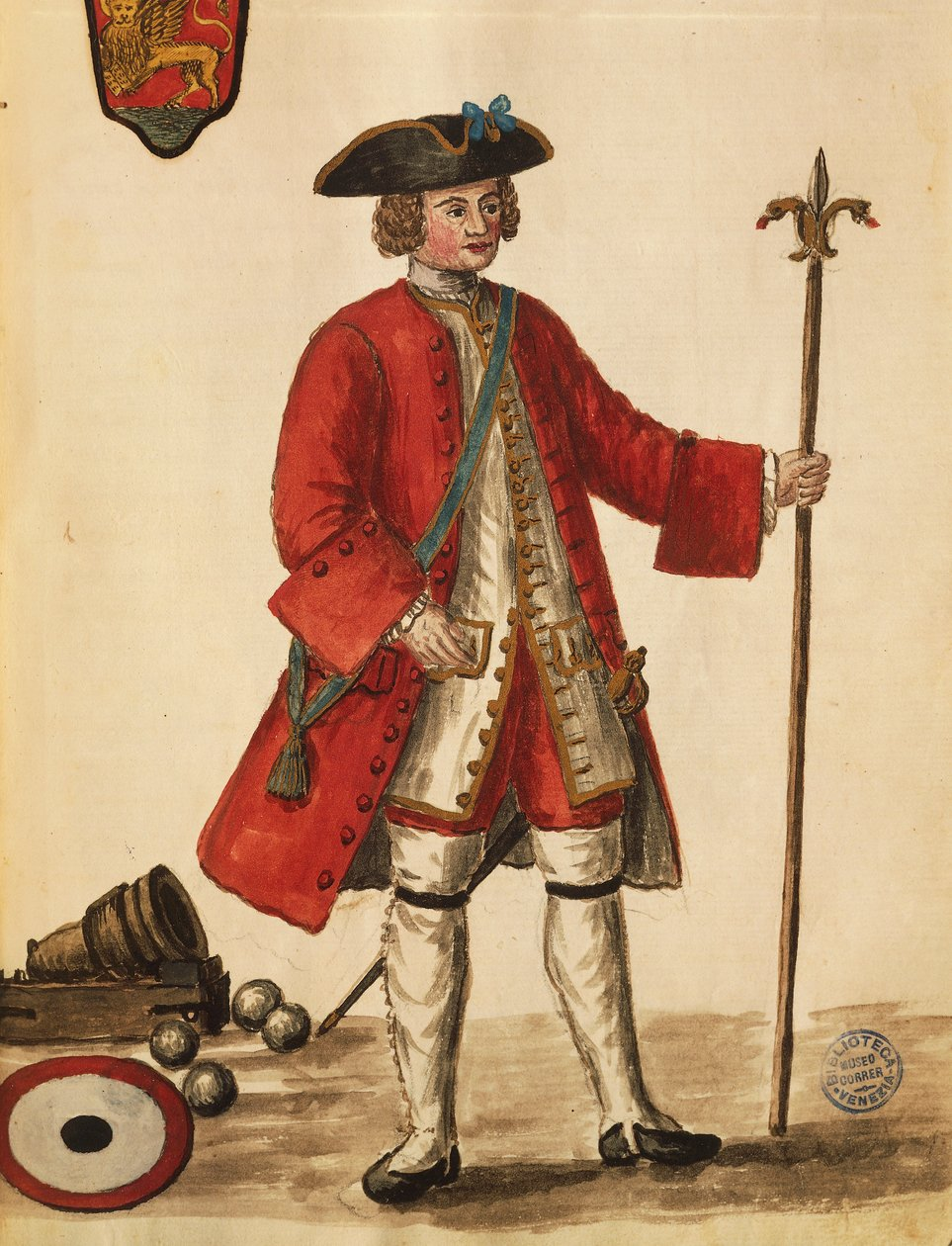
Venetian navy gunner, mid-18th century

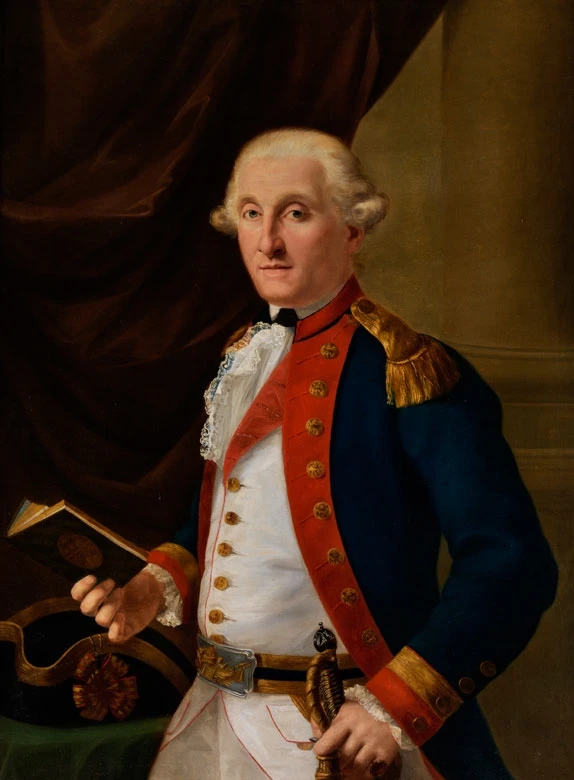
c. 1780 portrait of a Venetian navy officer

== Crews ==
For much of the navy's history, Venice employed free men as crewmen in its fleets. In the 13th and 14th centuries, conscription had been used to man fleets, but in the 15th century and on the Republic relied on wages for crewing both its warships and its merchant vessels. Pay was not very high in the merchant galleys—some 8–9 lire per month for an oarsman at the turn of the 16th century—but each crewman had the right to carry a set amount of merchandise on board the ship free of taxes or fares, allowing them to make considerable profits through what was in effect legalized smuggling. Demand for a place aboard such ships was so high that legislation had to be introduced repeatedly to combat the practice of sailors paying kickbacks to their captains so that they would be selected. Payment was considerably higher for the war galleys—12 lire at the turn of the 16th century—but the crews suffered deductions for clothing, medicine and clerical services, etc. On the other hand, while the chances for smuggling were smaller (but still extant) on a warship, a crewman could also hope to receive a share in any booty. Many of the galleys were manned in Venice's overseas positions, however, where galley service was unpopular, and where either conscripts or hired substitutes were used.

Convicts (condannati) and Muslim captives began to be employed as rowers in the Venetian navy c. 1542, when the first institutions to administer them are also attested. The post of governatore dei condannati was also created at this time. The use of convicts to row the galleys increased over time, except for the flagships and the galeasses. Finally, as the number of galleys in the Venetian fleet diminished in favour of sailing ships of the line, after 1721 all Venetian galleys were exclusively manned by convicts.

== Administration ==
Traditionally, all senior naval offices were occupied by members of the Venetian patriciate, and were selected by the Great Council of Venice, and only in particularly important cases by the Venetian Senate. In the 18th century, the Senate appropriated the right of selecting the Provveditore generale da Mar, as well as filling the positions of the sailing fleet. The selection of the other higher commands and of the galley fleet remained with the Great Council.

Up to the mid-16th century, naval matters were supervised by the five-member board of the savi agli ordini, but gradually a more complex and professional administration was built up. In 1545, the three Provveditori all'Armar were established to supervise the provisioning and equipment of the fleet and its crews, while the enlistment of crews and officers was the charge of the Savio alla Scrittura. The technical administration was exercised by the College of the Sea Militia (Colleggio della Milizia da Mar), a body analogous to the British Admiralty. It comprised the Provveditori all'Armar, the provveditori in charge of the Arsenal (all'Arsenale), of provisions (sopra i biscotti, "regarding the biscuits"), and the artillery (alle Artiglerie), as well as the paymasters of the fleet (Pagadori all'Armar), three of the savi, and a ducal councillor.

== See also ==
- Genoese navy, the Venetian navy's long time rival that had a similar history
- Hemp in the Republic of Venice
- Manila galleon, a Spanish trade route that bypassed the Ottoman and Arab controlled lands of the Levant
- List of sailing ships of the Venetian navy
- Venetian bombardments of the Beylik of Tunis (1784–1788)

== Sources ==
- Anderson, R. C. (1952). Naval Wars in the Levant 1559–1853. Princeton: Princeton University Press.
- Arbel, Benjamin (2013). "Venice's Maritime Empire in the Early Modern Period". A Companion to Venetian History, 1400–1797. BRILL. pp. 125–253. ISBN 978-90-04-25252-3.
- Candiani, Guido (2001). "L'evoluzione della flotta veneziana durante la prima guerra di Morea" (PDF) (Paper presented at Venezia e il Mediterraneo. La guerra di Morea seminar, held by the Fondazione Querini Stampalia – Dipartimento di Studi Storici, Venice, 25 May 2001) (in Italian).
- Candiani, Guido (2003). "Lo sviluppo dell'Armata grossa nell'emergenza della guerra marittima" (PDF). Storia di Venezia - Rivista (in Italian). I: 89–96. ISSN 1724-7446.
- Candiani, Guido (2009). I Vascelli della Serenissima: Guerra, politica e costruzioni navali a Venezia in età moderna, 1650-1720 (in Italian). Venice: Istituto Veneto di Scienze, Lettere ed Arti. ISBN 978-88-95996-20-2.
- Carro, Domenico (2015). Vox Navalis: Articoli di storia navale dell'antica Roma pubblicati sulla rivista Voce Romana. Youcanprint. ISBN 978-88-911-9590-6.
- Da Mosto, Andrea (1940). L'Archivio di Stato di Venezia. Indice Generale, Storico, Descrittivo ed Analitico. Tomo II: Archivi dell'Amministrazione Provinciale della Repubblica Veneta, archivi delle rappresentanze diplomatiche e consolari, archivi dei governi succeduti alla Repubblica Veneta, archivi degli istituti religiosi e archivi minori (PDF) (in Italian). Rome: Biblioteca d'arte editrice. OCLC 889222113. Archived from the original (PDF) on 2016-03-04.
- Haalmeijer, Hans; Vuik, Dik (2006). Aken, tjalken en kraken: zeilschepen van de Lage Landen: de binnenvaart. De Alk. ISBN 978-90-6013-274-6.
- Gould, Richard A. (2011). Archaeology and the Social History of Ships. Cambridge University Press. ISBN 978-1-139-49816-6.
- Guilmartin, John Francis (2007). "The Earliest Shipboard Gunpowder Ordnance: An Analysis of Its Technical Parameters and Tactical Capabilities". The Journal of Military History. 71 (3): 649–669. doi:10.1353/jmh.2007.0204. S2CID 162353666.
- Lane, Frederic C. (1973). "Naval actions and fleet organization, 1499–1502". In Hale, John R. (ed.). Renaissance Venice. London: Faber & Faber. pp. 146–173.
- Lane, Frederic C. (1982). "Wages and Recruitment of Venetian Galeotti, 1470–1580". Studi Veneziani. VI: 15–43.
- Lucas, Henry S. (1960). The Renaissance and the Reformation. Harper & Brothers. ISBN 0404198155.
- Manfroni, Camillo (1902a). "La battaglia di Gallipoli e la politica veneto-turca (1381–1420)". L'Ateneo Veneto (in Italian). XXV (II). Venice. Fasc. I, pp. 3–34; Fasc. II, pp. 129–169.
- Manfroni, Camillo (1897). Storia della marina italiana dalla caduta di Constantinopoli alla battaglia di Lepanto (in Italian). Rome: Forzani e C.
- Manfroni, Camillo (1899). Storia della marina italiana dalle invasioni barbariche al trattato di Ninfeo (in Italian). Livorno: Regia Accademia navale.
- Manfroni, Camillo (1902). Storia della marina italiana dal Trattato di Ninfeo alla caduta di Constantinopoli (in Italian). Livorno: Regia Accademia navale.
- Morrison, John S.; Gardiner, Robert, eds. (1995). The Age of the Galley: Mediterranean Oared Vessels Since Pre-Classical Times. London: Conway Maritime Press. ISBN 0-85177-554-3.
- Nani Mocenigo, Mario (1935). Storia della marina veneziana: da Lepanto alla caduta della Repubblica [History of the Venetian navy: from Lepanto to the fall of the Republic] (in Italian). Rome: Tipo lit. Ministero della Marina – Uff. Gabinetto.
- Nicol, Donald M. (1988). Byzantium and Venice: A Study in Diplomatic and Cultural Relations. Cambridge: Cambridge University Press. ISBN 0-521-34157-4.
- Zampieri, Francesco (2011). "Angelo Emo e la riforma della marina veneziana" (PDF). Le armi di San Marco: Atti del Convegno di Venezia e Verona, 29–30 settembre 2011. La potenza militare veneziana dalla Serenissima al Risorgimento (in Italian). Società Italiana di Storia Militare. pp. 123–154.
