= Provveditore all'Armata =

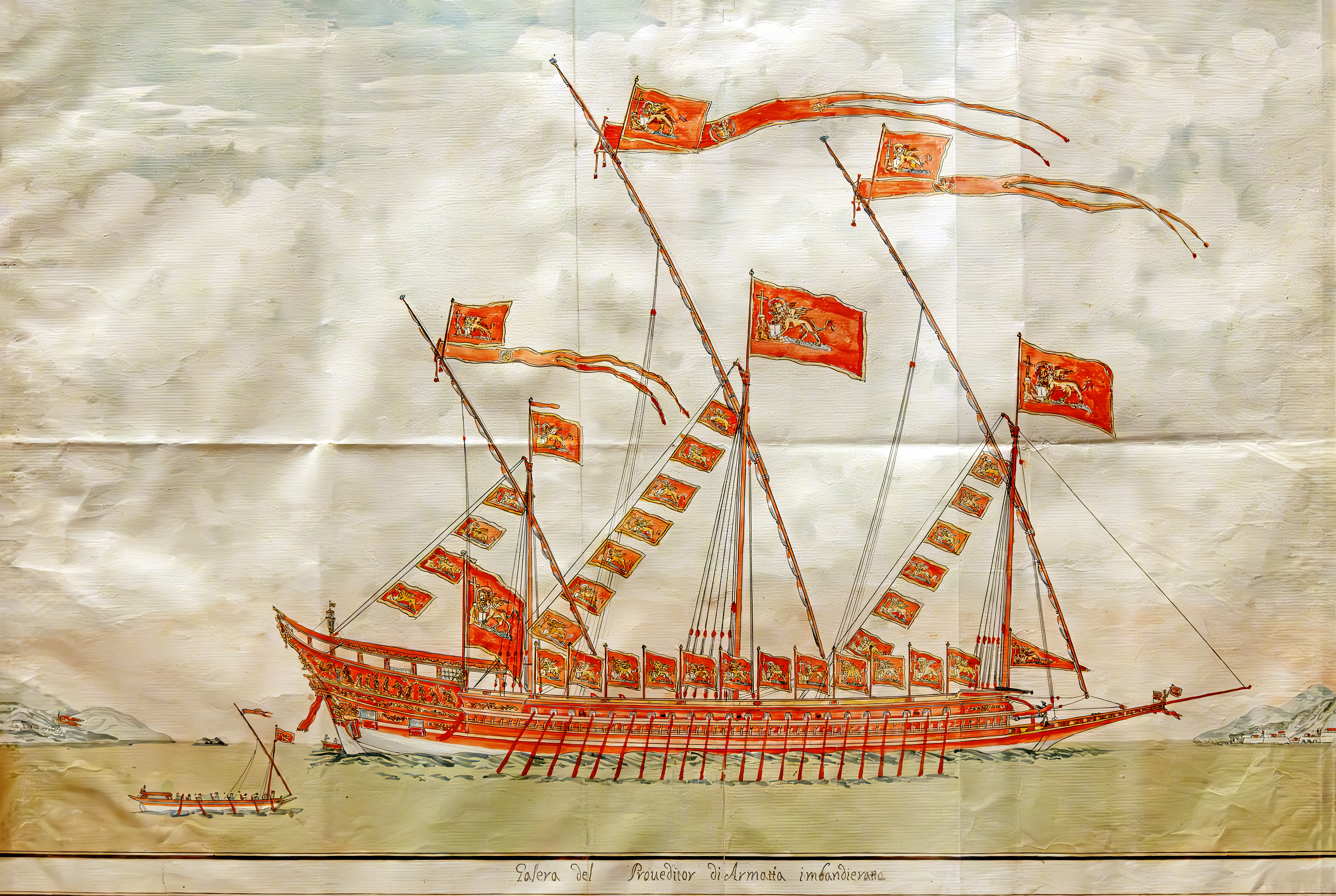
Beflagged galley of a Provveditore all'Armata in the 18th century

The Provveditore all'Armata or dell'Armata or d'Armata ("superintendent of the fleet") was a senior official and admiral of the Venetian navy. After the establishment of a sailing fleet (armata grossa) next to the traditional galley fleet (armata sottile) in the late 17th century, he was the most senior squadron admiral of the latter.

Until the Battle of Lepanto in 1571, the office was occupied by two holders, but thereafter this was usually disregarded as it was considered sufficient to appoint a single holder. When the Venetian fleet acquired ships of the line in the late 17th century, the Provveditore d'Armata remained as the senior of the admirals (Capi da Mar) who led the squadrons of the galley fleet (armata sottile), which stood under the overall command of the Provveditore Generale da Mar, along with the Captain of the Gulf, the Capitano delle galeazze and the Governatore dei condannati. Like all Capi da Mar, he hoisted his ensign on a bastard galley, with striped red-and-white sails and tents. As his distinctive signs, the flagship of the Provveditore d'Armata carried a single lantern and the standard of Saint Mark on a three-foot long staff topped by a "simple" gilded orb aft, a pennant in front, and square ensign of Saint Mark on the mainmast. In later times, the Provveditore d'Armata was allowed to show two lanterns aft.

== Sources ==
- Da Mosto, Andrea (1940). L'Archivio di Stato di Venezia. Indice Generale, Storico, Descrittivo ed Analitico. Tomo II: Archivi dell'Amministrazione Provinciale della Repubblica Veneta, archivi delle rappresentanze diplomatiche e consolari, archivi dei governi succeduti alla Repubblica Veneta, archivi degli istituti religiosi e archivi minori (PDF) (in Italian). Rome: Biblioteca d'arte editrice. OCLC 889222113. Archived from the original (PDF) on 2016-03-04.
- Nani Mocenigo, Mario (1935). Storia della marina veneziana: da Lepanto alla caduta della Repubblica [History of the Venetian navy: from Lepanto to the fall of the Republic] (in Italian). Rome: Tipo lit. Ministero della Marina - Uff. Gabinetto.
