= List of ship launches in 1790 =

The list of ship launches in 1790 includes a chronological list of some ships launched in 1790.

Date	Ship	Class	Builder	Location	Country	Notes
28 January	Argo	Fifth rate		Amsterdam	Dutch Republic	For Dutch Navy.
31 January	Hound	Hound-class sloop	Martin Ware	Deptford	Great Britain	For Royal Navy.
2 March	Fury	Hound-class sloop	George White	Portsmouth Dockyard	Great Britain	For Royal Navy.
March	Aurora	Full-rigged ship	Robertson & Glas	Calcutta	India	For private owner.
9 April	Fyodor Stratilat	Pyotr Apostol-class frigate	I. V. Dolzhnikov	Rogozhskaya	Russia	For Imperial Russian Navy.
14 April	Thésée	Téméraire-class ship of the line		Rochefort, Charente-Maritime	France	For French Navy.
15 April	Queen Charlotte	First rate		Chatham Dockyard	Great Britain	For Royal Navy.
23 April	Sviataia Aleksandra	Aleksandr-class rowing frigate	D. Masalsky	Kronstadt	Russia	For Imperial Russian Navy.
23 April	Sviataia Ekaterina	Aleksandr-class rowing frigate	D. Masalsky	Kronstadt	Russia	For Imperial Russian Navy.
23 April	Sviataia Elena	Akeksandr-class rowing frigate	D. Masalsky	Kronstadt	Russia	For Imperial Russian Navy.
23 April	Sviataia Mariia	Aleksandr-class rowing frigate	D. Masalsky	Kronstadt	Russia	For Imperial Russian Navy.
23 April	Sviatoi Aleksandr	Aleksandr-class rowing frigate	D.Masalsky	Kronstadt	Russia	For Imperial Russian Navy.
23 April	Sviatoi Konstantin	Aleksandr-class rowing frigate	D. Masalsky	Kronstadt	Russia	For Imperial Russian Navy.
23 April	Sviatoi Nikolai	Aleksandr-class rowing frigate	D. Masalsky	Kronstadt	Russia	For Imperial Russian Navy.
23 April	Sviatoi Pavel	Aleksandr-class rowing frigate	D. Masalsky	Kronstadt	Russia	For Imperial Russian Navy.
23 April	Voznesenie Gospodne	Fourth rate	S. I. Afanaseyev	Kherson	Russia	For Imperial Russian Navy.
24 April	Leopard	Portland-class frigate	William Rule	Sheerness Dockyard	Great Britain	For Royal Navy.
30 April	Brunswick	Third rate	Martin Ware	Deptford Dockyard	Great Britain	For Royal Navy.
3 May	Windsor Castle	London-class ship of the line		Deptford Dockyard	Great Britain	For Royal Navy.
15 May	Crescent	Merchantman	Marmaduke Stalkart	Rotherhithe	Great Britain	For John St Barbe.
18 May	Hjalmar	Hemmema	Frederik Henrik af Chapman	Vestervik	Sweden	For Royal Swedish Navy.
21 May	Narva	Briachislav-class frigate	M. D. Portnov	Arkhangelsk	Russia	For Imperial Russian Navy.
21 May	Revel	Briachislav-class frigate	M. D. Portnov	Arkhangelsk	Russia	For Imperial Russian Navy.
22 May	Aleksei	Iaroslav-class ship of the line	M. D. Portnov	Arkhangelsk	Russia	For Imperial Russian Navy.
22 May	Filipp	Aziia-class ship of the line	M. D. Portnov	Arkhangelsk	Russia	For Imperial Russian Navy.
22 May	Iona	Aziia-class ship of the line	M. D. Portnov	Arkhangelsk	Russia	For Imperial Russian Navy.
22 May	Piotr	Iaroslav-class ship of the line	M. D. Portnov	Arkhangelsk	Russia	For Imperial Russian Navy.
22 May	Riga	Briachislav-class frigate	M. D. Portnov	Arkhangelsk	Russia	For Imperial Russian Navy.
22 May	Unnamed	Sixth rate	M. D. Portnov	Arkhangelsk	Russia	For Imperial Russian Navy.
22 May	Unnamed	Sixth rate	M. D. Portnov	Arkhangelsk	Russia	For Imperial Russian Navy.
22 May	Unnamed	Sixth rate	M. D. Portnov	Arkhangelsk	Russia	For Imperial Russian Navy.
27 July	Boyne	Boyne-class ship of the line		Woolwich Dockyard	Great Britain	For Royal Navy.
27 July	Blenheim	West Indiaman	Peter Everitt Mestaer	Rotherhithe	Great Britain	For Fryer & Co.
30 July	Albanaise	Brig	Ricaude du Temple	Toulon	France	For French Navy.
30 July	Scipion	Téméraire-class ship of the line		Toulon	France	For French Navy.
7 August	Triton	Frigate	Ernst Wilhelm Stibolt	Copenhagen	Denmark-Norway	For Dano-Norwegian Navy.
25 August	Sviatoi Nikolai	Fifth rate	A. P. Solokov	Nicholaieff	Russia	For Imperial Russian Navy.
27 August	Perle	Minerve-class frigate		Toulon	France	For French Navy.
8 September	Inconstante	Charmante-class frigate		Rochefort	France	For French Navy.
9 September	Trial	Cutter	Thomas Dunsterville	Plymouth	Great Britain	For Royal Navy.
21 September	Prudente	Capricieuse-class frigate		Lorient	France	For French Navy.
26 September	Topaze	Magicienne-class frigate		Toulon	France	For French Navy.
8 October	Martin	Hound-class sloop	William Rule	Woolwich Dockyard	Great Britain	For Royal Navy.
9 October	Leviathan	Courageux-class ship of the line	John Nelson	Chatham Dockyard	Great Britain	For Royal Navy.
16 October	Alfred	East Indiaman	Todd & Pitcher	Northfleet	Great Britain	For British East India Company.
20 October	Prinses Frederika Louise Wilhelmina	Fourth rate	Pieter Glavimans	Rotterdam	Dutch Republic	For Dutch Navy.
23 October	Taunton Castle	East Indiaman	William Barnard	Deptford	Great Britain	For British East India Company.
7 November	Jean Bart	Téméraire-class ship of the line		Lorient	France	For French Navy.
8 November	Canton	East Indiaman	Wells	Deptford	Great Britain	For British East India Company.
8 November	États de Bourgogne	Océan-class ship of the line		Toulon	France	For French Navy.
20 November	Intrepido	Third rate	Bryant Tomas	Ferrol	Spain	For Spanish Navy.
22 November	Woodford	East Indiaman	Perry	Blackwall	Great Britain	For British East India Company.
23 November	True Briton	East Indiaman	John & William Wells	Deptford	Great Britain	For British East India Company.
20 December	Indomptable	Tonnant-class ship of the line		Brest	France	For French Navy.
Unknown date	Amphitrite	Merchantman	John & Francis Barry	Whitby	Great Britain	For James Atty.
Unknown date	Anna	Merchantman		Bombay Dockyard	India	For private owner.
Unknown date	Betsey	Slave ship		Liverpool	Great Britain	For William Boats.
Unknown date	Castor & Pollux	Merchantman		Teignmouth	Great Britain	For private owner.
Unknown date	Echo	Slave ship		Liverpool	Great Britain	For Mr. Staniforth.
Unknown date	Ecate	Cutter		Venice	Republic of Venice	For Venetian Navy.
Unknown date	Enea	Cutter		Venice	Republic of Venice	For Venetian Navy.
Unknown date	Enterprize	Slave ship		Liverpool	Great Britain	For Thomas Leyland & Thomas Molyneux.
Unknown date	General Medows	East Indiaman		Surat	India	For private owner.
Unknown date	Goree Packet	Ketch	Nicholas Bools & William Good	Bridport	Great Britain	For private owner.
Unknown date	Herald	Merchantman		Hull	Great Britain	For private owner.
Unknown date	Hilal-i Zafer	Third rate	Papaço Kalfa	Bodrum	Ottoman Empire	For Ottoman Navy.
Unknown date	Legma	Schooner			Russia	For Imperial Russian Navy.
Unknown date	Lowjee Family	Full-rigged ship		Bombay	India	For private.
Unknown date	Phoenix	Merchantman	Randall & Brent	Rotherhithe	Great Britain	For Hibert & Co.
Unknown date	Princess Royal	Slave ship		Liverpool	Great Britain	For John Dawson.
Unknown date	Providence	Merchantman	John Wallis	South Shields	Great Britain	For private owner.
Unknown date	Queen Charlotte	Merchantman		River Thames	Great Britain	For Hudson's Bay Company.
Unknown date	Ranger	Brig		Bombay	India	For Bombay Pilot Service.
Unknown date	Sirena	Fifth rate	Antonio Imbert	Castellamare del Golfo	Kingdom of Sicily	For Royal Sicilian Navy.
Unknown date	Soberano	Third rate		Barcelona	Spain	For Spanish Navy.
Unknown date	Sophie	Slave ship		Nantes	France	For private owner.
Unknown date	Styrburn	Hemmema	Fredrik Henrik af Chapman	Stockholm	Sweden	For Royal Swedish Navy.
Unknown date	Thames	Merchantman		Southampton	Great Britain	For Mr Hamilton.
Unknown date	Trelawney Planter	West Indiaman			(Kingdom of Great Britain) Jamaica	For private owner.
Unknown date	Trent	Merchantman		Hull	Great Britain	For private owner.
Unknown date	Voador	Brig			Portugal	For Portuguese Navy.
Unknown date	Winfrith	sloop	Nicholas Bools	Bridport	Great Britain	For William Samways.
Unknown date	Zephyr	West Indiaman		River Thames	Great Britain	For Kensington & Co.
Unknown date	Name unknown	Frigate			Kingdom of Sicily	For Royal Sicilian Navy.
Unknown date	Name unknown	Merchantman		Hamburg	Hamburg	For private owner.
Unknown date	Name unknown	Cutter			Great Britain	For private owner.
Unknown date	Name unknown	Merchantman		Bordeaux	France	For private owner.
Unknown date	Name unknown	Merchantman			France	For private owner.
Unknown date	Name unknown	Merchantman			France	For private owner.
Unknown date	Name unknown	Schooner			United States	For private owner.
Unknown date	Name unknown	Merchantman			Spain	For private owner.
Unknown date	Name unknown	Merchantman			France	For private owner.
Unknown date	Name unknown	Merchantman			Dutch Republic	For private owner.
