= Transport vessels for the British Government's importation of rice from Bengal (1795–1796) =

Wheat prices in Britain spiked in 1795, following an almost 40% drop in domestic grain output per acre. Popular pressure forced the British Government to charter transport vessels to import rice from Bengal.

The price of a "Winchester bushel" averaged about 6s 6d in 1794 but peaked at 13s 6d in August 1795. The price did not return to 6s 6d until March 1796. During the period of high prices municipal governments in towns such as Oxford and Cambridge seized cargoes of wheat passing through them, something that was illegal. There were bread riots in July–August 1795 in some 14 towns, which came to be known as the revolt of the housewives. Burials increased substantially in 1795 relative to 1794 and 1796. In response, the British Government took over the import of grains from abroad. All wheat imported up to the end of 1795 had been purchased on government account. It came either on government vessels or vessels chartered to the government.

Because the British East India Company (EIC) had a legal monopoly on all trade between Britain and India, the Government worked through the EIC for imports from Bengal. The EIC notified its administration in Bengal of the government's requirements; the government in Bengal then engaged vessels already there.

Absent original research, there appears to be only one readily available list of vessels chartered. There is nothing to indicate whether the list is exhaustive or only partial. Of the 14 vessels listed, 10 succeeded in arriving in Britain. The French captured two while they were en route, and two were wrecked.

The decision to import rice from Bengal lead to a similar program in 1800–1802. That time the program involved at least 28 vessels. Only two were lost.

Vessel	Master	Burthen (bm) (Note: Burthen is a volumetric measure of a vessel's size and does not translate into absolute tonnage of cargo a vessel can carry. All one may infer is that a vessel with a greater burthen is larger and could carry more cargo than one with a lesser burthen.)	Notes
Abercromby	John Gilmore	600, 615, or 670	
Amelia	Crawford	1000, or 1400	Captured on way to England; cargo loss charged to "His Majesty's Government"
Anna	M. Gilmore	850 or 899	Known as Bombay Anna
Berwick	John McTaggart	420, or 426	
Britannia	Thomas Nixon Jr.	384	
Chichester	R. Blake	362 or 450	
Eliza Ann	John Lloyd	459 or 500	
Favourite		900	Captured on way to England; cargo loss charged to "His Majesty's Government"
Ganges	Thomas Patrickson	617 or 700	
General Medows, or General Meadows	McDonald	340 or 575	
Harriet	Matthew Sparrow	373, or 500	
Hercules	Benjamin Stout	600 or 628	Wrecked on 15 June 1796 between Bengal and the Cape. Cargo loss charged to "His Majesty's Government".
Montrose		761	Wrecked between Bengal and the Cape. Cargo loss charged to "His Majesty's Government".
Nonsuch	Robert Duffin	483	
