= Trelawney Planter (ship) =

Several vessels have been named Trelawney Planter for Trelawny, Jamaica:

- Trelawney Planter (1790 ship) was built in Jamaica in 1790. She sailed as a West Indiaman, sailing between London and Jamaica. She was not listed in Lloyd's Register (LR) between 1797 and 1802. She re-entered LR in 1802. She continued to trade, lastly trading between Hull and London. She was last listed in 1812.
- Trelawney Planter (1798 ship), of 360 tons (bm), was built in New Brunswick in 1798. She first appeared in Lloyd's Register (LR) in 1799. Her master was Budge, her owner was Fleming, and her voyage was London to Gibraltar. On 12 April 1801, Trelawney Planter, White, master, was on her way to Suriname from London when a French frigate of 38 guns and 300 men captured her. The capture took place near Madeira and her captor sent Trelawney Planter to Tenerife. On 2 June 1801 the brig St Sebastian, White, master, arrived at Falmouth from Madeira. She was carrying 23 ladies and gentlemen who had been passengers on board Trelawney Planter, White, master, which had been on her way to Tobago from London when the French privateer ship Psyche had captured her and landed them at Madeira.
- Trelawney Planter (1801 ship) was built in 1801 in Jamaica as a West Indiaman. She was made of birch bark, hackmatack, and yellow pine. She first appeared in the 1801 volume of Lloyd's Register (LR) with M'Donald, master, and Sheddon, owner. She appears to have been a 20% larger successor to the earlier Trelawney Planter (1790 ship), with the same master and owner. On 24 February 1802 Trelawney Planter was driven ashore at Rio Bueno, Jamaica. She was later refloated. Lloyd's List reported in October 1808 that Trelawney Planter, Duncan, master, was sailing from London to Honduras when she encountered two privateers off the west end of Jamaica. After a smart action the privateers captured Trelawney Planter and took her into Cuba. Captain Duncan and part of his crew arrived in Honduras.
