= List of shipwrecks in 1791 =

The list of shipwrecks in 1791 includes ships sunk, foundered, wrecked, grounded or otherwise lost during 1791.

table of contents
1791
Jan	Feb	Mar	Apr
May	Jun	Jul	Aug
Sep	Oct	Nov	Dec
Unknown date

== January ==
=== 2 January ===
List of shipwrecks: 2 January 1791
Ship	State	Description
Unnamed	Ireland	The ship was wrecked at the entrane to Loch Ryan, Great Britain with the loss of all but one of her crew.

=== 5 January ===
List of shipwrecks: 5 January 1791
Ship	State	Description
HMS Actaeon	Royal Navy	The Roebuck-class ship was driven ashore in Cawsand Bay.

=== 8 January ===
List of shipwrecks: 8 January 1791
Ship	State	Description
Britannia	Great Britain	The ship foundered in the River Thames during a gale.

=== 20 January ===
List of shipwrecks: 20 January 1791
Ship	State	Description
Little Neptune	France	The ship was driven ashore and wrecked at Kilmore, Dublin, Ireland. She was on a voyage from Saint-Domingue to Dunkerque, Nord.
Lively	Great Britain	The whaler was driven ashore at Ramsgate, Kent. She was on a voyage from London to the South Seas.

=== 21 January ===
List of shipwrecks: 21 January 1791
Ship	State	Description
Charleston Packet	Ireland	The ship departed from a port in Carolina, United States for Larne, County Antrim. No further trace, presumed foundered in the Atlantic Ocean with the loss of all hands.
Unnnamed	Ireland	The wherry sank at Clontarf, County Dublin. Her crew were rescued by HMY Dorset (Royal Navy).

=== 31 January ===
List of shipwrecks: 31 January 1791
Ship	State	Description
Nancy	United States	The schooner was wrecked on Bodie Island, North Carolina with the loss of at least nine lives.

=== Unknown date ===
List of shipwrecks: Unknown date in January 1791
Ship	State	Description
Aimable Martha	Ireland	The ship was driven ashore near "the Ovens". She was on a voyage from Rouen, Seine-Inférieure, France to Cork.
Amity	Great Britain	The ship was driven ashore near Hull, Yorkshire. She was on a voyage from Hamburg to London.
Angelique	France	The ship ran aground on the Goodwin Sands, Kent, Great Britain. She was on a voyage from London to Havre de Grâce, Seine-Inférieure. She was refloated and taken in to Broadstairs, Kent in a severely damaged condition.
Ann	Ireland	The ship was driven ashore in the River Foyle. She was on a voyage from Philadelphia, Pennsylvania, United States to Londonderry.
Balloon	Ireland	The ship was driven ashore in the River Foyle. She was on a voyage from Cádiz, Spain to Londonderry.
Barclay	Great Britain	The ship was driven ashore in the River Foyle. She was on a voyage from, Philadelphia to Londonderry.
Baron Duhalde	France	The ship was lost on the French coast. She was on a voyage from Guadeloupe to Lisbon, Portugal and Bordeaux, Gironde.
Belfast	Great Britain	The ship was driven ashore in the River Severn. She was on a voyage from Bristol, Gloucestershire to Alicante, Spain.
Bellona	Great Britain	The ship was driven ashore at Deal, Kent. She was on a voyage from Livorno, Grand Duchy of Tuscany to London.
Betsey	Great Britain	The ship was driven ashore and wrecked 4 leagues (10 nmi; 19 km) from Quimper, Finistère, France with the loss of her captain. She was on a voyage from Gallipoli, Ottoman Empire to London.
Britannia	Great Britain	The ship sank in the River Thames. She was on a voyage from Leith, Lothian to London.
Britannia	Great Britain	The ship capsized at Lisbon and was declared beyond repair.
Briton	Great Britain	The ship foundered in the Atlantic Ocean 12 leagues (31 nmi; 58 km) off the Isles of Scilly with the loss of five of her crew. She was on a voyage from London to Georgia, United States.
HMRC Bushe	Great Britain	The Revenue cruiser foundered in the Atlantic Ocean off Galway, Ireland with the loss of five of her crew.
Carolina Gustaffa	Sweden	The ship was lost near "Christiansound". She was on a voyage from London to Gothenburg.
Ceres	Great Britain	The ship was wrecked on the coast of Yorkshire while on a voyage from King's Lynn, Norfolk to Leith.
Ceres	Great Britain	The ship was wrecked on the French coast. She was on a voyage from Maryland, United States to London.
Charlotte	Great Britain	The ship was driven ashore at Boulogne, Pas-de-Calais, France. She was on a voyage from Cork to London.
Choice	Great Britain	The ship was driven ashore at Audierne, Finistère. She was on a voyage from Nantes, Loire-Inférieure, France to London. Choice was refloated on 21 May and taken in to Audierne.
Courier	France	The ship foundered in the Bay of Biscay in early January while on a voyage from Bordeaux to the Cape of Good Hope.
Cousan	France	The ship was driven ashore at Dunkerque, Nord. She was on a voyage from Cette, Hérault to Dunkerque.
Deux Anges	France	The ship foundered in the Bay of Biscay in early January while on a voyage from Bordeaux to the Cape of Good Hope.
Deux Felicities	France	The ship was lost near Nantes. She was on a voyage from Marseille, Bouches-du-Rhône to Nantes.
Diana	Great Britain	The ship was wrecked on the Sandwich Flats. She was on a voyage from London to Bristol.
Dispatch	Ireland	The ship was wrecked near Livorno, Grand Duchy of Tuscany. She was on a voyage from Girbaltar to Livorno.
Dispatch	Great Britain	The ship was lost at Galipoly, Ottoman Empire. She was on a voyage from Naples, Kingdom of Sicily to Galipoly and Bruges, West Flanders, Dutch Republic.
Dublin and Philadelphia Packet	Ireland	The ship was driven ashore near Whitehaven, Cumberland, Great Britain. She was on a voyage from Philadelphia to Dublin.
Duc de Normandie	France	The ship foundered in the Bay of Biscay in early January while on a voyage from Bordeaux to Port-au-Prince, Saint-Domingue.
Earl of Eglington	Great Britain	The ship was driven ashore at Kirkcudbright. She was on a voyage from Liverpool, Lancashire to Dunkerque.
Elizabeth and Marguerite	France	The ship foundered in the Bay of Biscay in early January while on a voyage from Bordeaux to "Jeremiah".
Fair Helen	(Kingdom of Great Britain) Isle of Man	The ship was lost on the coast of Portugal. She was on a voyage from the Isle of Man to Ancona, Papal States.
Fanny	Great Britain	The ship was wrecked in the Mull of Galloway. She was on a voyage from Virginia to Greenock, Renfrewshire.
Four Friends	Great Britain	The ship foundered in the English Channel off the Isle of Wight. She was on a voyage from Nantes to Ostend, West Flanders, Dutch Republic.
Friendship	Great Britain	The ship was driven ashore and severely damaged at Spurn Point, Yorkshire. She was on a voyage from Königsberg, Prussia to Liverpool.
Friendship	Great Britain	The ship foundered in the Atlantic Ocean. Her crew were rescued by Fanny (Great Britain). Friendship was on a voyage from Boston to Montserrat. Fanny was subsequently wrecked (see above).
Germania	Bremen	The ship was driven ashore in the Weser. She was on a voyage from London to Bremen.
Good Intent	Dutch Republic	The ship was lost near Rye, Sussex. She was on a voyage from Málaga, Spain to Ostend.
Hannah	Ireland	The ship was driven ashore at the mouth of the Orne River, France. She was on a voyage from Dublin to Havre de Grâce, Seine-Inférieure, France.
Hannah	Great Britain	The ship sank at Ramsgate, Kent. She was on a voyage from Málaga to London.
Happy Return	Great Britain	The ship was driven ashore in the River Foyle. She was on a voyage from Philadelphia to Londonderry.
Henderson	Great Britain	The ship was wrecked at Carlingford, County Louth, Ireland while on a voyage from Livorno to Belfast, County Down, Ireland.
Henrietta	Great Britain	The ship was driven ashore at Alemouth, Northumberland. She was on a voyage from King's Lynn to the Firth of Forth.
Heureux Savage	France	The ship was driven ashore and wrecked near L'Orient, Morbihan while on a voyage from Barcelona, Spain to Dunkerque.
Increase	Great Britain	The ship was lost in St. Brides Bay. Her crew were rescued. She was on a voyage from Saint Kitts to London.
Integrity	Great Britain	The ship was driven ashore at Kirkcudbright.
John	Great Britain	The ship was lost at Memel, Prussia. She was on a voyage from Lisbon to Memel.
Jolly Cooper	Great Britain	The ship was lost in the Kinmare River. She was on a voyage from Milford, Pembrokeshire to Limerick, Ireland.
Jonge Christian	Danzig	The ship was lost on "The Holmes". She was on a voyage from London to Danzig.
Jonge Gottfried	Danzig	The ship was lost on "The Holmes". She was on a voyage from London to Danzig.
Juffrow Anna	Stettin	The ship was driven ashore at Beachy Head, Sussex, Great Britain while on a voyage from Gallipoli, Ottoman Empire to Stettin.
Juno	Great Britain	The ship was driven ashore at Pool, Dorset.
Lady Magdalena	Great Britain	The ship was lost whilst on a voyage from Liverpool to Bremen. Her crew were rescued.
L'Amiable Marianne	France	The ship foundered in the Bay of Biscay in early January while on a voyage from Bordeaux to Port-au-Prince.
La Nereede	France	The ship foundered in the Mediterranean Sea off Valencia, Spain.
La Princesse de Asturias	France	The ship foundered in the Bay of Biscay in early January while on a voyage from Bordeaux to Louisiana, New Spain.
Lark	Ireland	The ship was wrecked in Quiberon Bay. She was on a voyage from Cork to Brest, Finistère.
Leeming	Great Britain	The ship was lost whilst on a voyage from Liverpool to Caernarfon.
Lucy	Ireland	The ship was driven ashore at Holyhead, Anglesey, Great Britain. She was on a voyage from Lisbon to Dublin.
L'Union	France	The ship foundered in the Bay of Biscay in early January while on a voyage from Bordeaux to Martinique.
Mary	Great Britain	The ship foundered in the Atlantic Ocean 50 leagues (150 nautical miles (280 km)) west of Ouessant, Finistère. Her crew were rescued. She was on a voyage from Lisbon to Liverpool.p
Mary	Great Britain	The ship was driven ashore in Tramore Bay. She was on a voyage from Waterford, Ireland to London.
Nancy	Great Britain	The ship ran aground on the Gunfleet Sand, in the North Sea off the coast of Essex. She was on a voyage from Borrowstounness, Lothian to London.
Nancy	Great Britain	The ship was lost at Bilbao, Spain. She was on a voyage from Newfoundland, British America to Bilbao.
Neptune	Great Britain	The ship was lost whilst on a voyage from Liverpool to Great Yarmouth, Norfolk.
Ninety Electors	Great Britain	The ship foundered in the Bay of Biscay in early January while on a voyage from Bordeaux to Martinique.
Nostra Señora del Carmen	Spain	The ship was wrecked near Bordeaux while on a voyage from Bilbao to London.
Orange Tree	Great Britain	The ship was lost near Lytham St. Annes, Lancashire. She was on a voyage from Liverpool to Lytham St. Annes.
Patrioten	France	The ship was run into in The Downs and was severely damaged. She was on a vopyage from London to Marseille.
Peggy	Great Britain	The ship was wrecked off "Latiste" while on a voyage from Dundee, Perthshire to Setúbal, Portugal or St. Lucar, Spain.
Peggy	Great Britain	The ship was wrecked at Penmarc'h, Finistère. Her crew were rescued.
Penelope	Great Britain	The ship was driven ashore near New Romney, Kent with the loss of all hands. She was on a voyage from Livorno to Havre de Grâce.
Prince William	Great Britain	The ship was lost at Livorno. She was on a voyage from Newfoundland to Livorno.
Rebecca	Great Britain	The ship was driven ashore on the coast of Connemara, Ireland. She was on a voyage from Exmouth, Devon to Galway.
Robert's Adventure	Great Britain	The ship was lost. Her crew were rescued.
Susannah	United States	The ship was driven ashore at Porto, Portugal. She was on a voyage from New York to Porto.
Swift	Ireland	The ship was driven ashore near Wexford. She was on a voyage from Alicante to Newry, County Antrim.
Thomas and Ann	Great Britain	The ship was driven ashore at Boulogne with the loss of all hands.
Three Brothers	Ireland	The ship was driven ashore near Montreal-sur-Mer, Pas-de-Calais. She was on a voyage from Cork to Havre de Grâce.
Three Friends	Great Britain	The ship was lost whilst on a voyage from Waterford to Liverpool. Her crew were rescued.
Tryphena	Great Britain	The ship was driven ashore and wrecked in the Bay of Cádiz, Spain. She was on a voyage from Newfoundland to Cádiz.
Two Anns	Great Britain	The ship was lost on the French coast. She was on a voyage from Plymouth, Devon to London.
Two Friends	Great Britain	The ship was driven ashore at Ramsey, Isle of Man. She was on a voyage from Liverpool to London.
Weymouth	Great Britain	The ship was driven ashore and wrecked on the south coast of the Isle of Wight. She was on a voyage from Barcelona to London.
William	Great Britain	The ship ran aground on the Burbo Bank, in Liverpool Bay and was wrecked. She was on a voyage from New York to Liverpool.
Woolton	Great Britain	The ship was driven ashore at Chester, Cheshire. She was on a voyage from Liverpool to Virginia, United States.
Three unnamed vessels	Flags unknown	The ships were wrecked in Quiberon Bay.

== February ==
=== 4 February ===
List of shipwrecks: 4 February 1791
Ship	State	Description
Wilmington	United States	The ship was wrecked at Coolbeg, County Fermanagh, Ireland. She was on a voyage from Philadelphia, Pennsylvania to Belfast, County Antrim, Ireland.

=== 19 February ===
List of shipwrecks: 19 February 1791
Ship	State	Description
Fortuna	Duchy of Holstein	The ship departed from Glückstadt for London, Great Britain. No further trace, presumed foundered in the North Sea with the loss of all hands.

=== 26 February ===
List of shipwrecks: 26 February 1791
Ship	State	Description
Rose	Great Britain	The ship was driven ashore at Tetney, Lincolnshire. She was on a voyage from Hull, Yorkshire to London.

=== 28 February ===
List of shipwrecks: 28 February 1791
Ship	State	Description
De Valck	Dutch East India Company	The East Indiaman foundered in the North Sea off Great Yarmouth, Norfolk, Great Britain with the loss of six of the 58 people on board. She was on a voyage from Amsterdam to Batavia, Netherlands East Indies.

=== Unknown date ===
List of shipwrecks: Unknown in February date 1791
Ship	State	Description
Amphitrite	French Navy	The Dédaigneuse-class frigate was wrecked on the French coast with the loss of 106 of her 108 crew. She was on a voyage from the Île de France, Mauritius to L'Orient, Morbihan.
Ark	Great Britain	The ship was wrecked on the Nore, in the Thames Estuary. She was on a voyage from Zant, Venetian Republic to London.
Blessing	Great Britain	The ship was driven ashore near Birchington, Kent. She was on a voyage from London to Liverpool, Lancashire.
Boston Packet	Great Britain	The ship was lost on Little Island, off Alderney, Channel Islands. She was on a voyage from London to Boston, Massachusetts, United States.
Bridget	Ireland	The ship was lost near Havre de Grâce, Seine-Inférieure, France with the loss of all but her captain. She was on a voyage from Cork to Havre de Grâce.
Clara	Ireland	The ship was driven ashore and wrecked at Dublin. Her crew were rescued. She was on a voyage from New York, United States to Cork, Dublin and Belfast, County Antrim.
Dame Elizabeth	Sweden	The ship was driven ashore near "Suderwell". She was on a voyage from Rouen, Seine-Inférieure to Stockholm.
Diligence	Great Britain	The ship foundered in the North Sea. She was on a voyage from Gothenburg, Sweden to Borrowstounness, Lothian.
Eliza	Great Britain	The ship was driven ashore and wrecked near Aldeburgh, Suffolk. She was on a voyage from Leith, Lothian to London.
Elmyra	Great Britain	The ship was lost whilst on a voyage from Groningen, Dutch Republic to London.
Fanny	Great Britain	The ship was driven ashore at Lindisfarne, Northumberland. She was on a voyage from King's Lynn, Norfolk to the Firth of Forth.
Favourite	Great Britain	The ship was wrecked at Penzance, Cornwall with the loss of five of her crew. She was on a voyage from New York to Hull, Yorkshire.
Federalist	Great Britain	The ship was wrecked near Milford, Pembrokeshire. She was on a voyage from Cádiz to London.
Flora	Great Britain	The ship sank at Brest, Finistère, France. She was on a voyage from Porto, Portugal to Plymouth, Devon.
Friends	(Kingdom of Great Britain) Guernsey	The ship was driven ashore near Margate, Kent. She was on a voyage from Newcastle upon Tyne, Northumberland to Guernsey.
Hannah	Great Britain	The ship was lost whilst on a voyage from South Shields, County Durham to London.
Hazard	Great Britain	The ship was lost in Carnarvon Bay. She was on a voyage from Lisbon, Portugal to Liverpool.
Henrica	Spain	The ship was destroyed by fire at Barcelona. She was on a voyage from Barcelona to Honfleur, Calvados, France.
Industry	Great Britain	The ship was lost near Jural Inner Hebrides. She was on a voyage from Spain to Liverpool.
Industry	Great Britain	The ship was wrecked near Ormes Head, Caernarfonshire.
Jeune Henriette	France	The ship foundered in the English Channel off Boulogne, Pas-de-Calais while on a voyage from L'Orient to Ostend, West Flanders, Dutch Republic.
Jeune Louis	France	The ship was lost near La Rochelle, Charente-Maritime. She was on a voyage from Saint-Domingue to Bordeaux, Gironde.
Johanna Catharina	Flag unknown	The ship was destroyed by fire at Cartagena, Spain. Two other vessels were also burnt.
Jonge Cornelius	Dutch Republic	The ship foundered in the Mediterranean Sea off Valencia, Spain while on a voyage from Amsterdam to a Mediterranean port.
Juliana	Denmark	The Guineaman was wrecked on Anholt.
Keatie	Great Britain	The ship was driven ashore crewless near Cromer, Norfolk.
Lady Salton	Great Britain	The ship was lost whilst on a voyage from Liverpool to Inverness.
L'Amiable Meritte	France	The brig foundered in the Mediterranean Sea between Cape De Gatt and Alborán Island, Spain.
La Nereede	France	The ship was wrecked near Valencia, Spain. She was on a voyage from Marseille, Bouches-du-Rhône to Île de France, Mauritius.
London Merchant	Great Britain	The ship was run down and sunk in the River Thames. She was on a voyage from the Charente to London.
Lucinda	Great Britain	The ship was driven ashore in Gibraltar Bay. She was later refloated and take in to Gibraltar.
Martha	Great Britain	The ship was driven ashore in Carmarthen Bay. She was on a voyage from Shoreham-by-Sea, Sussex to Liverpool.
Mary	Great Britain	The ship sank at Ramsgate, Kent.
Mary and Ann	Great Britain	The ship foundered in the North Sea off Great Yarmouth, Norfolk. She was on a voyage from Rotterdam, South Holland, Dutch Republic to London.
Matthias Hendrick	Lübeck	The ship was wrecked on Saaremaa, Russia. She was on a voyage from Lübeck to Reval, Russia.
Mercury	Great Britain	The ship was wrecked in the Isles of Scilly. She was on a voyage from Virginia, United States to London.
Mould	Great Britain	The ship was driven ashore and wrecked at Southwold, Suffolk. She was on a voyage from Hull to London.
Neptune	Great Britain	The ship was driven ashore and wrecked near Pool, Dorset. She was on a voyage from Swanage, Dorset to London.
Resolution	Great Britain	The ship was driven ashore near Cromer. She was on a voyage from London to South Shields.
St. George	Great Britain	The ship was lost in the Vlie. She was on a voyage from St. Ubes, Portugal to Amsterdam, North Holland, Dutch Republic.
St. James	Ireland	The ship was driven ashore in the River Foyle. She was on a voyage from New York to Londonderry.
Vrow Piche	Hanover	The ship was driven ashore near Kingsgate, Kent. She was on a voyage from Emden to London.
Zufriedenheit	Flag unknown	The ship was driven ashore in Cardigan Bay.
Unnamed	Great Britain	The sloop was driven ashore near Birchington.
Unnamed	Bremen	The ship was lost off the Swedish coast. She was on a voyage from Bremen to Nantes, Loire-Inférieure.
Unnamed	Flag unknown	The ship ran aground and sank on the Goodwin Sands, Kent.
Unnamed	Hamburg	The ship ran aground and sank on the Goodwin Sands. She was reported to be on a voyage from Altona to Hamburg.

== March ==
=== 1 March ===
List of shipwrecks: 1 March 1791
Ship	State	Description
William	Great Britain	The ship was driven ashore at Sheerness, Kent. She was on a voyage from London to the South Seas.

=== 7 March ===
List of shipwrecks: 7 March 1791
Ship	State	Description
Antony (Антоний, 'Anthony')	Imperial Russian Navy	The frigate was destroyed by fire in the Dnieper estuary due to negligence during hull charring.

=== 20 March ===
List of shipwrecks: 20 March 1791
Ship	State	Description
Edgar	Great Britain	The ship was wrecked at Cape Falio, Dutch Cape Colony. All on board were rescued.

=== Unknown date ===
List of shipwrecks: Unknown date in March 1791
Ship	State	Description
Arab	Great Britain	The ship was wrecked on the coast of Portugal. She was on a voyage from Bristol, Gloucestershire to Africa.
Catherine	Great Britain	The ship was wrecked at Dumfries with the loss of her captain. She was on a voyage from London to Liverpool, Lancashire.
Commerce	Ireland	The ship was lost at the mouth of the River Shannon. She was on a voyage from Philadelphia, Pennsylvania, United States to Limerick.
Concordia	Great Britain	The ship was lost near Margate, Kent. She was on a voyage from Hull, Yorkshire to a Mediterranean port.
Duke of Sudermania	Sweden	The ship foundered in the North Sea off Dunkerque, Nord, France. Her crew were rescued. She on a voyage from Norrköping to Havre de Grâce, Seine-Inférieure, France.
Favourite	Great Britain	The ship was lost near Boulogne, Pas-de-Calais, France. She was on a voyage from Charleston, South Carolina to Ostend, West Flanders, Dutch Republic.
Fortune	Dutch Republic	The ship was lost whilst on a voyage from Cádiz, Spain to Amsterdam.
Four Friends	Dutch Republic	The ship was lost near Calais, France. She was on a voyage from Amsterdam to Charleston.
François	Flag unknown	The ship was driven ashore near Ostend.
Friends	Dutch Republic	The ship was lost near Boulogne. She was on a voyage from Amsterdam to Naples, Kingdom of Sicily.
Friendship	Great Britain	The ship foundered in the Mediterranean Sea off Bône, Algeria.
Havry Alem	United States	The brig was wrecked on Eierland, North Holland, Dutch Republic with the loss of all but her captain. She was on a voyage from Charleston to Hamburg.
Helen & Mary	Great Britain	The ship was driven ashore and wrecked near Dawpool, Cheshire. She was on a voyage from Liverpool to Marseille, Bouches-du-Rhône, France.
Industry	Great Britain	The ship was driven ashore at "Holmstadt", Sweden. She was on a voyage from Crombie Point, Fife to a Baltic port.
Lark	Great Britain	The ship capsized in the English Channel. She was towed into Dover, Kent still in a capsized state. She was on a voyage from Rotterdam, South Holland, Dutch Republic to London.
Le Cultivation	France	The ship was lost on the French coast. Her crew were rescued by Perseverance (Great Britain). Le Cultivation was on a voyage from Marseille to Dunkerque, Nord.
Les Deux Sœurs	France	The ship was lost whilst on a voyage from Marseille to Havre de Grâce.
Lord Mansfield	Great Britain	The ship sank in the River Bann. She was on a voyage from Rotterdam to Coleraine, County Antrim, Ireland.
Lyon	Great Britain	The ship was in collision with Northumberland ( British East India Company) in the River Thames and was beached at Tilbury Fort, Essex. Lyon was on a voyage from London to Cork, Ireland and Newfoundland, British America. She was later refloated.
Minerva	Great Britain	The ship foundered while on a voyage from Cádiz, Spain to Havre de Grâce, Seine-Inférieure, France.
Nancy	Great Britain	The ship was driven ashore near Scarborough, Yorkshire to London.
New Concord	Great Britain	The ship was run into by another vessel and was severely damaged. She was on a voyage from London to Havre de Grâce. She put in to Dover.
Olive Branch	Great Britain	The ship was destroyed by fire at Kincardine. She was on a voyage from Kincardine to Gothenburg, Sweden and Copenhagen, Denmark.
Peace	Great Britain	The ship was lost off "Cape St. Marie". She was on a voyage from Naples to Galipoly, Ottoman Empire.
Sally	Ireland	The ship was driven ashore at Dublin. She was on a voyage from Cork to Dublin.
Ville de Paris	France	The whaler was lost off "Holstone". She was on a voyage from the South Seas to Dunkerque.
Unnamed	Great Britain	The ship was wrecked at Margate. Twelve crew were rescued.

== April ==
=== 29 April ===
List of shipwrecks: 29 April 1791
Ship	State	Description
Termagant	Great Britain	The ship was destroyed by fire at Georgetown.

=== Unknown date ===
List of shipwrecks: Unknown date in April 1791
Ship	State	Description
Argo	Great Britain	The ship ran aground on the Holme Sand, in the Humber. She was on a voyage from Memel, Prussia to Hull, Yorkshire.
Charles & Margaret	Ireland	The ship was lost on the west coast of Ireland. She was on a voyage from Belfast, County Antrim to Drontheim, Norway.
Duke of York	Great Britain	The ship was wrecked on the Goodwin Sands, Kent. All on board were rescued. She was on a voyage from Dunkerque, Nord, France to Dover, Kent.
Eagle	Great Britain	The ship was lost near Flamborough Head, Yorkshire. She was on a voyage from London to South Shields, County Durham.
Fortitude	Great Britain	The ship was driven ashore in the Cattewater.
Goed Hoep	Dutch Republic	The ship foundered in the Baltic Sea off Gotland, Sweden with the loss of all hands. She was on a voyage from St. Ubes, Portugal to Riga, Russia.
James	Great Britain	The ship was driven ashore at Calais, France. She was on a voyage from London to Calais.
Jane	Great Britain	The ship was wrecked on Texel, North Holland, Dutch Republic. She was on a voyage from Boston to Amsterdam, North Holland.
Liberty	Ireland	The ship struck the Tuskar Rock. She subsequently drove ashore on the coast of County Wexford and was wrecked. She was on a voyage from Cork to Greenock, Renfrewshire, Great Britain.
Providence	Great Britain	The ship was wrecked on Ameland, Friesland, Dutch Republic.
Royal Oak	Great Britain	The ship was in collision with Peggy (Great Britain) and sank. Her crew were rescued by Peggy.
Sisters	Great Britain	The ship was lost in the Loire. She was on a voyage from Liverpool, Lancashire to Nantes, Loire Atlantique, France.

== May ==
=== 8 May ===
List of shipwrecks: 8 May 1791
Ship	State	Description
Lifartun (Лифартун)	Imperial Russian Navy	The ship sank at Taganrog due to hull rot.

=== Unknown date ===
List of shipwrecks: Unknown date in May 1791
Ship	State	Description
Admiral Rodney	Great Britain	The ship was wrecked on Heligoland. She was on a voyage from Genoa to Hamburg.
Invincible	France	The ship was driven ashore at Rochefort, Charente-Maritime. She was on a voyage from Guadeloupe to Bordeaux, Gironde.
Juffrow Dorothea	Danzig	The ship was driven ashore at Elsinore, Denmark. She was on a voyage from Danzig to Saint-Valery-sur-Somme, France.
Vrow Ailka	Flag unknown	The ship was run down and sunk in the Baltic Sea off Ystad, Sweden. She was on a voyage from "Flatholm" to Narva, Russia.
Young Thomas	Danzig	The ship was driven ashore at Dunnet Head, Caithness, Great Britain. She was on a voyage from Danzig to Liverpool, Lancashire, Great Britain.

== June ==
=== 2 June ===
List of shipwrecks: 2 June 1791
Ship	State	Description
Eliza	Great Britain	The ship was lost at Bonny, Nigeria. She was on a voyage from Bristol, Gloucestershire to Africa.

=== Unknown date ===
List of shipwrecks: Unknown date in June 1791
Ship	State	Description
Aurora	Great Britain	The ship was driven ashore and wrecked in the River Thames at Rotherhithe, Middlesex. She was on a voyage from London to Smyrna, Ottoman Empire.
Diana	Great Britain	The ship was driven ashore and wrecked on Saaremaa, Russia. She was on a voyage from Liverpool, Lancashire to Riga, Russia.
Edinburgh	Great Britain	The ship was driven ashore and wrecked on Shuna. She was on a voyage from Greenock, Renfrewshire to Hamburg.
Gallant	Great Britain	The ship was driven ashore at Aldeburgh, Suffolk. She was on a voyage from Porto, Portugal to Aldeburgh.
Goede Henessight	Denmark	The ship was driven ashore on Saaremaa. She was on a voyage from Copenhagen to Riga.
Hannah	Great Britain	Captain Holiday's ship was driven ashore and wrecked on Saaremaa. She was on a voyage from Liverpool to Riga.
Hannah	Great Britain	Captain Murdoch's ship was driven ashore on Saaremaa. She was on a voyage from Leith, Lothian to Riga.
Les Trois Sœurs	France	The ship was lost near Ostend, West Flanders, Dutch Republic.
Mary	Great Britain	The ship foundered in the North Sea off Banff.
Mayflower	Ireland	The ship foundered in the Atlantic Ocean off The Rosses, County Donegal. She was on a voyage from Limerick to Sligo.
Sophia Dorothea Amelia	Prussia	The ship was lost near Dunkerque, Nord, France. She was on a voyage from Königsberg to Pool, Dorset, Great Britain.

== July ==
=== 5 July ===
List of shipwrecks: 5 July 1791
Ship	State	Description
Speedwell	(Kingdom of Great Britain) Barbados	The ship capsized with the loss of a crew member. She was on a voyage from New London to Barbados.

=== Unknown date ===
List of shipwrecks: Unknown date in July 1791
Ship	State	Description
Gaspye	Great Britain	The brig foundered. Her crew were rescued.
Greenland	Great Britain	The ship foundered in the Norwegian Sea 90 leagues (230 nmi; 430 km) north west of Nordkapp, Denmark-Norway. Her crew were rescued by Lady Jane (Great Britain).
Hopewell	Great Britain	The ship was lost near Boston, Lincolnshire. She was on a voyage from Pool to Hull, Yorkshire.
St. Laurent	France	The ship was driven ashore at Dunkerque, Nord. She was on a voyage from Tobago to Dunkerque.

== August ==
=== 5 August ===
List of shipwrecks: 10 August 1791
Ship	State	Description
Unnamed	Great Britain	The ship foundered between Priestholm, Anglesey and Great Orme Head, Caernarfonshire with the loss of all on board..
Unnamed	Great Britain	The sloop was wrecked on the Hoyle Sand with the loss of all on board.

=== 10 August ===
List of shipwrecks: 10 August 1791
Ship	State	Description
Richard	Great Britain	The ship was driven ashore near Dragør, Denmark. She was on a voyage from Stockholm. Sweden to Hull, East Riding of Yorkshire.

=== 12 August ===
List of shipwrecks: 12 August 1791
Ship	State	Description
Elizabeth	Great Britain	The ship was wrecked on the Anholt Reef, Denmark. She was on a voyage from St. Ubes, Portugal to a Baltic port.

=== 21 August ===
List of shipwrecks: 21 August 1791
Ship	State	Description
Joseph	Great Britain	The ship was driven ashore at Crosby, Lancashire. She was on a voyage from Jamaica to Liverpool, Lancashire. She was later refloated.

=== 24 August ===
List of shipwrecks: 24 August 1791
Ship	State	Description
Foulis	British East India Company	The East Indiaman was lost whilst on a voyage from Madras to Bencoolen, India.

=== 29 August ===
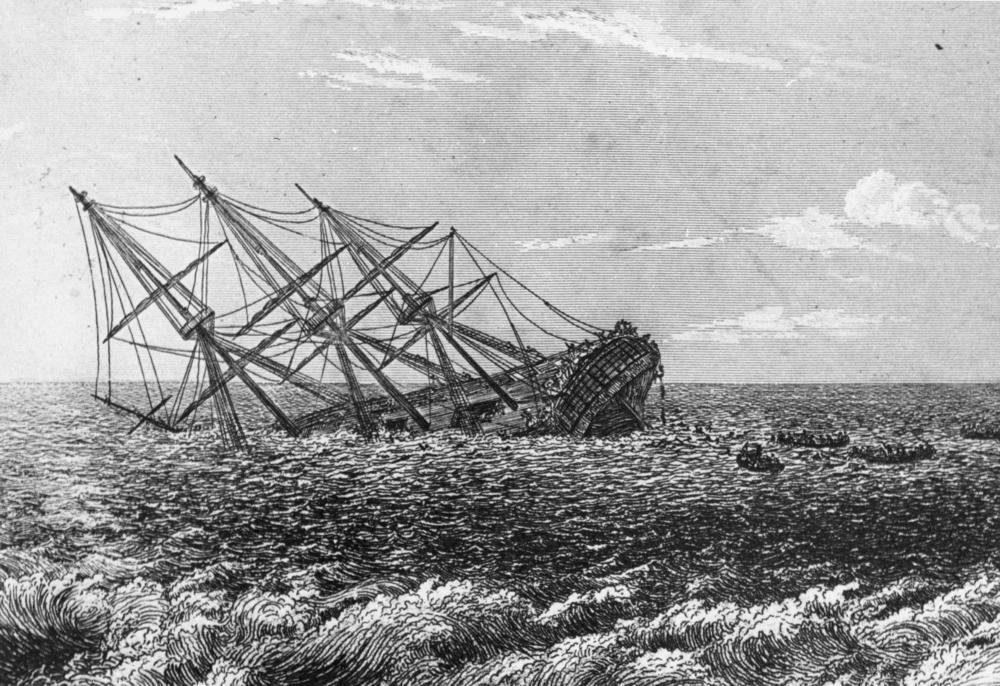
HMS Pandora.

List of shipwrecks: 29 August 1791
Ship	State	Description
HMS Pandora	(Kingdom of Great Britain) Royal Navy	The Porcupine-class sixth rate post ship was wrecked on the Great Barrier Reef with the loss of 35 of the 134 people on board.

=== Unknown date ===
List of shipwrecks: Unknown date in August 1791
Ship	State	Description
De Triede	Sweden	The ship foundered in the Kattegat off Gothenburg while on a voyage from Stockholm to Maldon, Essex, Great Britain.
Grace	United States	The ship was destroyed by fire off Texel, North Holland, Dutch Republic.
Juno	Great Britain	The ship was lost near Hogland, Russia. Her crew were rescued. She was on a voyage from London to Saint Petersburg, Russia.
Kite	Great Britain	The ship was driven ashore and wrecked at Ostend, West Flanders, Dutch Republic. She was on a voyage from Zant, Republic of Venice to London and Ostend.

== September ==
=== 1 September ===
List of shipwrecks: 1 September 1791
Ship	State	Description
Isabella	Great Britain	The ship was wrecked on Bornholm, Denmark. Her crew were rescued. She was on a voyage from Stettin to Saint Petersburg, Russia.

=== 2 September ===
List of shipwrecks: 2 September 1791
Ship	State	Description
Pitt	Great Britain	The ship was driven ashore and wrecked near "Hornbeck", Denmark. She was on a voyage from Great Yarmouth, Norfolk to Saint Petersburg, Russia.
Unnamed	Dutch Republic	The ship was driven ashore and wrecked near "Hornbeck" with the loss of two of her crew.

=== 3 September ===
List of shipwrecks: 3 September 1791
Ship	State	Description
Albany	Great Britain	The ship was driven ashore and wrecked 40 nautical miles (74 km) south of Memel, East Prussia.
Betsy	Great Britain	The ship was driven ashore and wrecked 40 nautical miles (74 km) south of Memel.
Unnamed	Sweden	The ship was driven ashore near Helsingør, Denmark.
Unnamed	Denmark	The ship was driven ashore near Helsingør.

=== 30 September ===
List of shipwrecks: 30 September 1791
Ship	State	Description
Thomas and Helen	Great Britain	The ship was driven ashore and wrecked in Valencia Bay, Spain. She was on a voyage from Barcelona, Spain to Valencia and Bristol, Gloucestershire.

=== Unknown date ===
List of shipwrecks: Unknown date in September 1791
Ship	State	Description
Ann	Great Britain	The ship was lost near Minehead, Somerset with the loss of four of her crew. She was on a voyage from New York, United States to Bristol, Gloucestershire.
Cecilia	Great Britain	The ship was driven ashore on Læsø, Denmark. She was refloated.
Commerce	Great Britain	The ship was lost at Anholt, Denmark. Her crew were rescued. She was on a voyage from Dysart, Fife to Anholt. She was later refloated and taken in to Memel, Prussia.
Commerce	Great Britain	The ship was driven ashore on Bornholm, Denmark. She was on a voyage from Kirkcaldy, Fife to Bornholm.
Earl & Amelia	Danzig	The ship was driven ashore near Danzig. she was on a voyage from Danzig to Ireland.
Friendship	Great Britain	The ship foundered with the loss of all hands. She was on a voyage from Danzig to Liverpool, Lancashire.
Hiram	Great Britain	The ship was lost near Amlwch, Anglesey with the loss of all but one of her crew. She was on a voyage from Liverpool to Boston.
Jenny	Great Britain	The ship was lost whilst on a voyage from South Shields, County Durham to London.
Johan	Dutch Republic	The ship was lost in the Baltic Sea. She was on a voyage from Amsterdam, North Holland to Stettin.
Johan	Dutch Republic	The ship was lost in the Baltic Sea. She was on a voyage from Rotterdam. South Holland to Stettin.
Maria	Sweden	The ship was lost on the coast of Sweden. She was on a voyage from Riga, Russia to Gothenburg.
Michael	Stettin	The ship was lost in the Baltic Sea. She was on a voyage from Stettin to Bordeaux, Gironde, France.
Ranger	Great Britain	The whaler was destroyed by fire in the River Thames. She was on a voyage from the South Seas to London.
St Joseph	Great Britain	The ship foundered in the English Channel off Beachy Head, Sussex. Her crew were rescued. She was on a voyage from Guernsey, Channel Islands to London.
Thetis	Great Britain	The ship was driven ashore and severely damaged near Margate, Kent.
Trent	Great Britain	The ship was lost on Hogland, Russia. She was on a voyage from London to Saint Petersburg, Russia.
Union	Great Britain	The ship was driven ashore on "Summers Island". She was on a voyage from Saint Petersburg to Whitby, Yorkshire.
Wilhelmina Carolina	Stettin	The ship was lost in the Baltic Sea.
Wohlfaart	Sweden	The ship was driven ashore on the south coast of the Isle of Wight, Great Britain. She was on a voyage from Stockholm to Dublin, Ireland. Wohlfaart was later refloated and taken in to Cowes, Isle of Wight.

== October ==
=== 4 October ===
List of shipwrecks: 4 October 1791
Ship	State	Description
Neptune	Great Britain	The brig sprang a leak and foundered in the Atlantic Ocean off the Azores (longitude 26° W) while on a voyage from Dartmouth, Devon to Newfoundland, British North America. Her crew were rescued by Dart (France).
Polly & Betsey	United States	The ship capsized and sank. She was on a voyage from New York to New Providence, New Jersey.
Seaflower	United States	The ship capsized in the Atlantic Ocean with some loss of life. Her crew were rescued. She was on a voyage from New York to Antigua
Unnamed	Great Britain	The barge was destroyed by fire in the River Thames at Deptford, Kent.

=== 19 October ===
List of shipwrecks: 19 October 1791
Ship	State	Description
Mary & Susannah	(Kingdom of Great Britain) British America	The ship was sestroyed by fire at Great Brule, Newfoundland. She was on a voyage from Newfoundland to Naples, Kingdom of Sicily.
Neptune	Ireland	The ship was driven ashore at Waterford. She was on a voyage from Chester, Cheshire, Great Britain to Wexford.
Unnamed	Great Britain	The sloop ran aground and sank at the mouth of the River Wye with the loss of both crew.

=== 25 October ===
List of shipwrecks: 25 October 1791
Ship	State	Description
Columbine	Great Britain	The ship departed from Newfoundland, British America for Vigo, Spain. No further trace, presumed foundered in the Atlantic Ocean with the loss of all hands.
Friendship	Great Britain	The ship departed from Newfoundland for Figueira da Foz, Portugal. No further trace, presumed foundered in the Atlantic Ocean with the loss of all hands.
John	(Kingdom of Great Britain) Jersey	The ship departed from Burin, Newfoundland for Bilbao, Spain. No further trace, presumed foundered in the Atlantic Ocean with the loss of all hands.

=== 26 October ===
List of shipwrecks: 26 October 1791
Ship	State	Description
Diligence	United States	The barque foundered in the Atlantic Ocean. Seven of her crew took to a boat. They were rescued on 20 December by Royal (United States). Diligence was on a voyage from Guadeloupe to Nantes, Loire-Inférieure, France.

=== Unknown date ===
List of shipwrecks: Unknown date in October 1791
Ship	State	Description
Almy	Great Britain	The ship was driven ashore at Stromness, Orkney Islands. She was on a voyage from Danzig to Liverpool, Lancashire.
Charles	Great Britain	The ship foundered in the Irish Sea off Milford Haven, Pembrokeshire while on a voyage from Bridgwater, Somerset to Exeter, Devon. Her crew were rescued.
Elizabeth and Kitty	Great Britain	The ship foundered in the Irish Sea off Milford Haven while on a voyage from Liverpool to Dartmouth, Devon. Her crew were rescued.
Emily	Great Britain	The ship sprang a leak and foundered in the Aegean Sea off Delos, Greece. Her crew were rescued.
Fanny	Great Britain	The ship sprang a leak and foundered in the English Channel off The Lizard, Cornwall.
General Elliot	Great Britain	The ship was driven ashore and wrecked. She was on a voyage from London to Saint Petersburg, Russia.
Hannah	Great Britain	The sloop caught fire and foundered in the North Sea off Whitby, Yorkshire with the loss of two of her crew. She was carrying a cargo of quicklime.
Helena	Great Britain	The ship was driven ashore in Swanage Bay. She was on a voyage from London to Whitehaven, Cumberland.
John	(Kingdom of Great Britain) Isle of Man	The ship was lost near Belfast, County Antrim, Ireland with the loss of most of her crew. She was on a voyage from Douglas to Plymouth, Devon.
Joseph and Mary	Great Britain	The ship was driven ashore and wrecked on the coast of Jutland. She was on a voyage from Berwick upon Tweed to a Baltic port.
Margaret	Great Britain	The ship was lost near Dunkerque, Nord, France. She was on a voyage from Liverpool to Ostend, West Flanders, Dutch Republic.
Marquis de la Fayette	Great Britain	The ship foundered in the Atlantic Ocean while on a voyage from London to Philadelphia, Pennsylvania, United States.
Mary	Great Britain	The ship was driven ashore in the Bristol Channel. She was on a voyage from Bristol, Gloucestershire to Jamaica.
Royal Escape	Great Britain	The ship was driven ashore in Cardigan Bay. She was on a voyage from Norway to Cardigan.
Thames	Great Britain	The ship was abandoned in the North Sea off Aldeburgh, Suffolk. She was on a voyage from Saint Petersburg to London. Thames was later taken in to Great Yarmouth, Norfolk.
Ulrica	Dutch Republic	The ship was lost on the Dutch coast. She was on a voyage from Saint Petersburg to Ostend, West Flanders.
Vrow Elizabeth Maria	Flag unknown	The ship was lost near Trondheim, Norway. She was on a voyage from Arkhangelsk, Russia to Lisbon, Portugal.

== November ==
=== 6 November ===
List of shipwrecks: 6 November 1791
Ship	State	Description
Blessed Endeavour	Great Britain	The ship was driven ashore and wrecked at Dover, Kent. She was on a voyage from Southampton, Hampshire to Dover.

=== 17 November ===
List of shipwrecks: 17 November 1791
Ship	State	Description
Exuma	Ireland	The ship was lost at Oracabessa, Jamaica. She was on a voyage from Jamaica to Dublin.

=== 25 November ===
List of shipwrecks: 25 November 1791
Ship	State	Description
Liberty	Great Britain	The ship was wrecked on São Miguel Island, Azores. Her crew were rescued.

=== 27 November ===
List of shipwrecks: 27 November 1791
Ship	State	Description
Charlotte and Maria	Great Britain	The ship was driven ashore and wrecked at Carsaig, Isle of Mull with the loss of two of her crew. She was on a voyage from Saint Petersburg, Russia to Liverpool, Lancashire.
Jessie	Great Britain	The ship foundered off Lunga, Slate Islands with the loss of all hands.
Minerva	Great Britain	The ship was driven ashore and wrecked at the mouth of the River Ribble. She was on a voyage from Jamaica to Lancaster, Lancashire.

=== Unknown date ===
List of shipwrecks: Unknown date in November 1791
Ship	State	Description
Active	Great Britain	The ship was lost near Great Yarmouth, Norfolk.
Admiral Stromfeldt	Sweden	The ship was driven ashore near "Ohlsund". She was on a voyage from Norrköping to Marseille, Bouches-du-Rhône, France.
Anna Maria	Portugal	The ship was driven ashore on Bardsey Island, Carnarvonshire, Great Britain. She was on a voyage from Liverpool, Lancashire, Great Britain to Lisbon.
Aurora	Great Britain	The ship was driven ashore at Memel, Prussia.
Briggs	Great Britain	The ship was driven ashore and wrecked at Kirkwall, Orkney Islands She was on a voyage from Saint Petersburg, Russia to Whitehaven, Cumberland.
Countess of Scarborough	Great Britain	The ship was driven ashore at Memel.
Dolphin	Great Britain	The ship foundered in the Gulf of Finland. She was on a voyage from Saint Petersburg to London.
Essex	Great Britain	The ship was driven ashore at the mouth of the Guadalquivir River, Spain. She was on a voyage from the United States to Cádiz, Spain.
Estrella d'Asia	Portugal	The ship was driven ashore and wrecked on Bornholm, Denmark with the loss of three of her crew. She was on a voyage from Saint Petersburg to Porto.
François	France	The ship departed from Ostend, West Flanders, Dutch Republic for Marseille. No further trace, presumed foundered with the loss of all hands.
Fortune	Russia	The ship was wrecked on the Girdler Sand. She was on a voyage from Saint Petersburg to Venice.
Groot Sohn	Danzig	The ship was lost at Falsterbo, Sweden. She was on a voyage from Danzig to Plymouth, Devon, Great Britain.
Hercules	France	The ship was lost on the coast of Brittany with the loss of all but two of her crew. She was on a voyage from Bordeaux, Gironde to Hamburg.
Johanna Maria	Sweden	The ship was driven ashore and wrecked at Corton, Suffolk, Great Britain with the loss of all but one of her crew. She was on a voyage from Stockholm to London, Great Britain.
Lark	Great Britain	The ship was wrecked on the northern coast of Jutland. She was on a voyage from Copenhagen, Denmark to Roscoff, Finistère, France.
Luce	Great Britain	The ship was destroyed by fire in The Swin, off the coast of Essex. She was on a voyage from Saint Petersburg to London.
Maryland	United States	The ship was driven ashore on the coast of Zeeland, Dutch Republic. She was on a voyage from Maryland to Rotterdam, South Holland, Dutch Republic.
Munificent	Great Britain	The ship was lost in the Orkney Islands. She was on a voyage from Memel to Liverpool, Lancashire.
Olive Tree	Great Britain	The ship was lost near Stromness, Orkney Islands. She was on a voyage from Hull, Yorkshire to Riga, Russia.
Plympton	Great Britain	The ship foundered in the Atlantic Ocean. She was on a voyage from Málaga, Spain to Dublin, Ireland.
Portland	Great Britain	The ship was driven ashore on the Sand Head. She was on a voyage from Weymouth, Dorset to London.
Providence	Great Britain	The ship was driven ashore at Whitby, Yorkshire. She was later refloated and taken in to Whitby.
Rebecca	Great Britain	The ship was driven ashore 8 leagues (24 nautical miles (44 km)) from Marseille. She was on a voyage from Gibraltar to Marseille.
Sodermanland	Sweden	The ship was wrecked on the Lemon and Ore, in the North Sea while on a voyage from Stockholm to London. Her eighteen crew were rescued the next day by Swanland (Great Britain). Sodermanland was on a voyage from Stockholm to London.
Susan	Great Britain	The ship was wrecked near Kinsale, County Cork, Ireland. Her crew were rescued. She was on a voyage from Charleston, South Carolina, United States to Liverpool.
Swallow	Denmark	The ship was driven ashore near Pillau, Prussia. She was on a voyage from Copenhagen to Pillau.
Thetis	Sweden	The brig was driven ashore at North Foreland, Kent, Great Britain and was wrecked. Her crew were rescued. She was on a voyage from Wisby to Livorno, Grand Duchy of Tuscany.
Unnamed	Flag unknown	The full-rigged ship was wrecked in the Gulf of Mexico near Cape Florida, West Florida before 9 November.

== December ==
=== 4 December ===
List of shipwrecks: 4 December 1791
Ship	State	Description
Elizabeth	Great Britain	The sloop was driven ashore at North Somercotes, Lincolnshire.
Fanny, and an unnamed vessel	Great Britain; Flag unknown	The ship was run down and sunk in the North Sea off "Dunlington", Yorkshire by an unidentified vessel, which was reported to have probably sunk too.
Good Intent	Great Britain	The sloop was driven ashore at North Somercotes.

=== 6 December ===
List of shipwrecks: 6 December 1791
Ship	State	Description
Grampus	Great Britain	The ship was driven ashore and wrecked at Memel, Prussia.
Jean	Great Britain	The ship was driven ashore and wrecked at Memel.
Two or three unnamed vessels	Great Britain	The ships were driven ashore and wrecked at Memel.
Two of three unnamed vessels	Flags unknown	The ships were driven ashore and wrecked at Memel.

=== 12 December ===
List of shipwrecks: 12 December 1791
Ship	State	Description
Pelham	Great Britain	The sloop foundered in the North Sea off Flamborough Head, Yorkshire.
Unnamed	Great Britain	The sloop foundered in the North Sea off Cromer, Norfolk with the loss of all on board.

=== 24 December ===
List of shipwrecks: 24 December 1791
Ship	State	Description
Swallow	Great Britain	The ship was driven ashore at Parkgate, Cheshire. She was on a voyage from Liverpool, Lancashire to Waterford, Ireland.

=== Unknown date ===
List of shipwrecks: Unknown date in December 1791
Ship	State	Description
Aguila	Dutch East India Company	The East Indiaman was driven ashore at Vlissingen. She was on a voyage from Ostend to India. She was later refloated and taken in to Middelburg.
Ann	Great Britain	The ship foundered in the Bristol Channel with the loss of all hands. She was on a voyage from Bristol, Gloucestershire to Biddiford, Devon.
Ann	Great Britain	The ship was lost on Hogland, Russia. She was on a voyage from Saint Petersburg, Russia to Liverpool, Lancashire.
Antonetta	Dutch Republic	The ship foundered in the English Channel off Dartmouth, Devon. Her crew were rescued. She was on a voyage from Dort, South Holland, to Barcelona, Spain.
Belhaven	United States	The ship was lost on Texel, North Holland Dutch Republic. She was on a voyage from Virginia to Dunkerque, Nord, France.
Bethia	Great Britain	The ship was lost near Vlissingen, Zeeland, Dutch Republic. She was on a voyage from Aberdeen to Ostend.
Betsey	Great Britain	The ship was lost near Figueira da Foz, Portugal. She was on a voyage from Newfoundland, British America to Figueira da Foz.
Betsey	Great Britain	The ship was lost near Cádiz, Spain. She was on a voyage from Fowey, Cornwall to Venice.
Catharine	Great Britain	The ship was wrecked on the coast of Cornwall. She was on a voyage from London to Chepstow, Monmouthshire.
Center	Great Britain	The ship was driven ashore at Great Yarmouth, Norfolk. She was on a voyage from South Shields, County Durham to London.
Ceres	Great Britain	The ship was lost in the Orkney Islands. She was on a voyage from Quebec, Lower Canada, British America to Aberdeen.
Charles	Great Britain	The ship foundered in the North Sea off Great Yarmouth. She was on a voyage from Sunderland, County Durham to Great Yarmouth.
Charles & Maria	Great Britain	The ship was wrecked on the west coast of Scotland with the loss of two of her crew. She was on a voyage from Saint Petersburg to Liverpool.
Charlotte	Stettin	The ship was driven ashore at Treptowe, Swedish Pomerania. She was on a voyage from Stettin to Bordeaux, Gironde, France.
Cholmley	Great Britain	The ship was driven ashore on the Baltic coast.
Cleveland	Great Britain	The ship was driven ashore at Hornsea, Yorkshire. She was on a voyage from Stockton on Tees, County Durham, to Hull, Yorkshire.
Constantia	Great Britain	The ship was driven ashore on the Dutch coast.
Departement	France	The ship was driven ashore and wrecked near Rye, Sussex, Great Britain. She was on a voyage from Whitby, Yorkshire to Marseille, Bouches-du-Rhône.
Deux Frères	France	The ship was lost at the mouth of the Loire. She was on a voyage from Port-au-Prince, Saint-Domingue to Nantes, Loire-Inférieure.
Eagle	Great Britain	The ship was wrecked near Bridlington, Yorkshire.
Ebenezer	Great Britain	The ship was driven ashore near Rye. She was on a voyage from King's Lynn, Norfolk to Liverpool.
Eleanor	United States	The ship was lost on the Dutch coast. She was on a voyage from Virginia to Amsterdam, North Holland, Dutch Republic.
Elizabeth	Great Britain	The ship was driven ashore near Boulogne, Pas-de-Calais, France. She was on a voyage from London to Calais.
Endeavour	Great Britain	The ship was driven ashore and wrecked near Ulverston, Lancashire. She was on a voyage from Liverpool to Castlehaven, County Cork, Ireland.
Exeter & Dirk	Great Britain	The ship was lost on the Dutch coast. She was on a voyage from Hamburg to Málaga, Spain.
Falmouth	Great Britain	The ship was lost on the coast of France. She was on a voyage from Gijón, Spain to London.
Flora	Great Britain	The ship was wrecked on the coast of Norfolk. She was on a voyage from Stockton-on-Tees to London.
Friendship	Great Britain	The ship was wrecked at Ilfracombe, Devon with the loss of all but four of her crew. She was on a voyage from Bristol to Swansea, Glamorgan.
Friendship	Great Britain	The ship was run down and sunk off Greenock, Renfrewshire.
Good Desire	Great Britain	The ship ran aground on the Lapsand, in the Baltic Sea. She was on a voyage from Memel, Prussia to Scarborough, Yorkshire. Good Desire had been refloated by 24 December and taken in to Elsinore, Denmark.
Hampden	Great Britain	The ship was driven ashore at Cowes, Isle of Wight.
Hebe	France	The whaler was driven ashore near Dunkerque. She was on a voyage from the South Seas to Dunkerque.
Hebe	Ireland	The ship was lost near Le Verdon-sur-Mer, Gironde, France with the loss of all hands. She was on a voyage from Cork to Bordeaux.
Industry	Great Britain	The ship was driven ashore at Hoylake, Cheshire.
Isabella	Great Britain	The ship was wrecked near Spurn Point, Yorkshire. She was on a voyage from South Shields to London.
James	Great Britain	The ship was driven ashore at Craydon Head. She was on a voyage from Carmarthen to Greenock, Renfrewshire.
Jane	Great Britain	The ship was lost at Memel.
Jeune Eulalie	France	The ship was lost near Ostend. She was on a voyage from Dunkerque to Nantes.
Joseph & Mary	Great Britain	The ship was driven ashore at "East Stoke". She was on a voyage from Dungarvan, County Antrim, Ireland to Portsmouth, Hampshire and Chichester, Sussex.
King's Fisher	Great Britain	The ship was lost on the Isle of Purbeck, Dorset.
La Dame Martha	France	The ship fouundered. Her crew were rescued. She was on a voyage from Saint-Valery-sur-Somme to Alexandria, Egypt.
Leeds	Great Britain	The ship was driven ashore at Spurn Point. She was on a voyage from Virginia, United States to Hull.
London	Great Britain	The ship was wrecked on the Point of Ayre, Isle of Man while on a voyage from Rotterdam, South Holland, Dutch Republic to Liverpool.
Louis	Hamburg	The ship was wrecked on Texel. She was on a voyage from Hamburg to Bordeaux.
Manchester	Great Britain	The ship was driven ashore at Liverpool. She was on a voyage from Lisbon, Portugal to Liverpool.
Minerva	Great Britain	The ship was driven ashore at Llanddwin Point, Anglesey. She was on a voyage from Youghall, County Cork, Ireland to Liverpool.
Neptune	Great Britain	The ship was lost near Bornholm, Denmark. She was on a voyage from Liverpool to Danzig.
Newe Onderneeming	Dutch Republic	The ship was wrecked on Texel. She was on a voyage from Surinam to Amsterdam.
Norfolk	Great Britain	The ship was lost on the Point of Ayre. She was on a voyage from Wells-next-the-Sea to Liverpool.
Perseverance	Great Britain	The ship was driven ashore at Boulogne. She was on a voyage from London to Limerick, Ireland.
Providence	Great Britain	The ship was driven ashore and wrecked at Great Yarmouth. She was on a voyage from Shoreham-by-Sea, Sussex to Hull.
Prudence	Great Britain	The ship was lost on "Catsmore". She was on a voyage from Arkhangelsk, Russia to Bristol.
Rebecca	Great Britain	The ship was driven ashore and wrecked 8 leagues (24 nautical miles (44 km)) west of Marseille while on a voyage from Gibraltar to Marseille.
Recovery	Great Britain	The ship was driven ashore at Huelva, Spain. She was on a voyage from Gibraltar to Faro, Portugal.
Reward	Great Britain	The ship was wrecked near Calais with the loss of all hands. She was on a voyage from Dublin to London.
Richard	Great Britain	The ship was lost near Ilfracombe. She was on a voyage from Newhaven, Sussex to Dublin, Ireland.
Rosalie	France	The ship foundered off Cherbourg, Seine-Inférieure. She was on a voyage from Riga, Russia to Barcelona, Spain.
Rose	Great Britain	The ship was driven ashore near Holyhead, Anglesey. She was on a voyage from Dublin to Bristol.
Sabrina	Great Britain	The ship was driven ashore at Conway, Carnarvonshire. She was on a voyage from Limerick to Liverpool.
St. Michael, Nostra Señora Delas Gracias	Spain	The ship was lost at the mouth of the Guadalquivir River. She was on a voyage from the Canary Islands to St Lucar.
Two Brothers	Great Britain	The ship was driven ashore and wrecked at Great Yarmouth.
Three Sisters	Great Britain	The ship was driven ashore and wrecked at Formby Point, Lancashire. She was on a voyage from Waterford, Ireland to Liverpool.
Unity	Great Britain	The ship was driven ashore at Noordwijk, South Holland, Dutch Republic. She was on a voyage from Fredrikstadt, Norway to Shoreham-by-Sea.
Vale	Great Britain	The ship was driven ashore at Beaumaris, Anglesey. She was on a voyage from Grenada to Liverpool.
Vrede	Dutch Republic	The ship was lost near Boulogne. She was on a voyage from Rotterdam to Havre de Grâce, Seine-Inférieure.
William	Great Britain	The ship was wrecked on the coast of Cornwall with the loss of all but two of her crew. She was on a voyage from Waterford, Ireland to London.
William	Great Britain	The ship was lost near St. Lucar. She was on a voyage from London to St. Lucar.
Zeelust	Flag unknown	The ship was lost at "Stevensklindt". She was on a voyage from "Wyborg", Sweden to Cádiz.
Unnamed	Flag unknown	The ship was wrecked on the Goodwin Sands.
Unnamed	Flag unknown	The brig was driven ashore in the River Dee.

== Unknown date ==
List of shipwrecks: Unknown date in 1791
Ship	State	Description
Activité	France	The ship was lost on the coast of Gold Coast, Africa.
Alexis	Great Britain	The ship was lost at Labrador, British America.
Alliance	France	The ship was driven ashore on Long Island, Antigua. She was on a voyage from Havre de Grâce, Seine-Inférieure to Saint-Domingue
Ally	Great Britain	The ship was wrecked on Cayo Romano, Cuba. Her crew were rescued. She was on a voyage from Africa to Dominica and Havana, Cuba.
Amity	Great Britain	The ship sprang a leak and foundered in the Atlantic Ocean 15 leagues (45 nautical miles (83 km)) west of the Îles de Los, Africa. She was on a voyage from the Îles de Los to Cape Mount, Africa.
Ann and Bridget	Great Britain	The ship foundered in the Caribbean Sea off Grenada.
Arab	Great Britain	The ship was driven ashore and wrecked on the Portuguese coast while on a voyage from Bristol, Gloucestershire to an African port.
Bella Gertrudis	Spain	The ship foundered in the Atlantic Ocean. She was on a voyage from Havana to St. Andero.
Benezick	France	The ship foundered in the Indian Ocean of Mozambique. She was on a voyage from the Île de France, Mauritius to the West Indies.
Betsey	Great Britain	The ship was driven ashore and wrecked on the Barnegat Peninsula, New Jersey, United States with the loss of her captain. She was on a voyage from London to New York.
Betsey	(Kingdom of France) French East India Company	The East Indiaman was wrecked on the Isle of Bourbon with the loss of 167 lives. She was on a voyage from the Île de France to Bordeaux, Gironde.
Betsey	Great Britain	The ship was driven ashore in the Delaware River, United States.
Blessing	Great Britain	The whaler was lost off the coast of Greenland.
Bonette	France	The ship was lost on the coast of Africa. She was on a voyage from Nantes, Loire-Inférieure to Africa and the West Indies.
Boston and Liverpool Packet	Great Britain	The ship was driven ashore on the Barnegat Peninsula. She was on a voyage from Liverpool, Lancashire to Philadelphia, Pennsylvania, United States.
Britannia	Ireland	The ship was driven ashore near Savannah, Georgia, United States. she was on a voyage from Savannah to Cork.
British Queen	Great Britain	The ship was driven ashore on Grand Manan Island, British America. She was on a voyage from Greenock, Renfrewshire to Halifax and New Brunswick, British America.
Charlton	Great Britain	The ship was lost at Miramichi, New Brunswick.
Concord	Great Britain	The ship was wrecked in the Abaco Islands. She was on a voyage from London to New Providence, New Jersey, United States.
Dartmouth	Great Britain	The ship was lost in the Turks Islands. She was on a voyage from New York to Jamaica.
Dispatch	Great Britain	The ship foundered whilst on a voyage from Topsham, Devon to Newfoundland, British America.
Dove	(Kingdom of Great Britain) Nevis	The schooner was lost at Saint Kitts.
Edwardus	Dutch East India Company	The East Indiaman was wrecked east of Cape Agulhas, Africa. with the loss of three of her crew. She was on a voyage from Bengal to Ostend.
Eliza	(Kingdom of Great Britain) British America	The ship foundered off the coast of Africa.
Eliza	Great Britain	The brig was lost at Savannah, Georgia, United States. She was on a voyage from Barbados to Shelburne, Nova Scotia.
Eliza	United States	The ship was lost on the coast of Africa.
Fame	Great Britain	The brig was wrecked on Saint Pierre Island. Her crew were rescued. She was on a voyage from London to Quebec, Lower Canada, British America.
Fanny	Great Britain	The ship was destroyed by fire at St. Andrew, New Brunswick, British America.
Free Briton	Great Britain	The ship foundered in the Adriatic Sea off Venice. She was on a voyage from Great Yarmouth, Norfolk to Venice.
Good Intent	Great Britain	The ship was wrecked at Saint Barthélemy. She was on a voyage from Dominica to Grenada and Glasgow, Renfrewshire.
Governour Bickney	Great Britain	The ship was lost at Charleston, South Carolina, United States. She was on a voyage from Charleston to Cape Français, Saint-Domingue.
Hazard	Great Britain	The schooner was lost at Saint Kitts.
Henry	Great Britain	The ship foundered off Placentia Harbour, Newfoundland. She was on a voyage from Alicante, Spain to Newfoundland.
Hope	Great Britain	The ship was lost at Newfoundland.
King George 1787 ship (2)	Great Britain	African slave trade: The ship was lost at Barbados with the loss of 280 of the 360 slaves on board.
La Louise Cherie	(Kingdom of France) French East India Company	The East Indiaman was wrecked at the Cape of Good Hope. Her crew were rescued.
Louisa	Great Britain	The ship was driven ashore in the Chesapeake River, United States. She was on a voyage from Port-au-Prince to Virginia.
Little Peggy	Great Britain	The ship was lost near Cuba. She was on a voyage from Jamaica to North Carolina, United States.
Lively	Great Britain	The brig was lost off Martyr's Reef. She was on a voyage from Jamaica to Bristol.
Mary	Great Britain	The ship was lost at Bonny, Nigeria.
Mary	Great Britain	The ship was lost in the Turks Islands. She was on a voyage from New York to Jamaica.
Minx	Great Britain	African slave trade The ship was lost near "Cape St. Mary's" with the loss of all slaves on board. Her crew were rescued. She was on a voyage from Africa to the West Indies.
Monkey	Great Britain	The ship foundered in the Grand Banks of Newfoundland. Her crew were rescued.
Nancy	France	The ship was lost off "St. Antona".
Nantz	Great Britain	The ship was lost in the Hampton Roads, Virginia. She was on a voyage from Virginia to London.
Neptune	Great Britain	The whaler was lost off the coast of Greenland.
Nostra Señora dos Prazeres and San Jozé	Spain	The ship was lost at Maranhão, Brazil.
Olive Branch	Great Britain	The whaler was lost on the coast of Patagonia, Brazil. She was on a voyage from London to the South Seas.
Perseverance	United States	The almost completed experimental steamer broke lose from her moorings in a severe storm sometime in 1791 and was driven onto Petty's Island in the Delaware River opposite Philadelphia. She was abandoned due to lack of finances.
Phebe	Great Britain	The ship was lost at British Honduras. She was on a voyage from British Honduras to London.
Prince of Asturias	France	The ship was lost in the Gulf of Florida. She was on a voyage from New Orleans, Louisiana, New Spain to Bordeaux.
Prosperous	Great Britain	The whaler was lost on the Barbary Coast. She was on a voyage from London to the South Seas.
Rainbow	Great Britain	The ship was lost near Cape Henry, Virginia. She was on a voyage from Newfoundland to Baltimore, Maryland, United States.
Recovery	Great Britain	The ship was destroyed by fire whilst on a voyage from Boston to Liverpool.
Robert & Mary	Great Britain	The ship was lost in the Abaco Islands. She was on a voyage from Wilmington, Delaware, United States to Barbados.
Ross	Great Britain	The ship was lost in the Gulf of Florida.
Sally	Great Britain	The ship was lost in the West Indies. She was on a voyage from London to Port-au-Prince.
Sally	Great Britain	The ship was lost on the Barbary Coast. Her crew were rescued. She was on a voyage from London to Africa.
Simon Taylor	Great Britain	The ship was lost in the Windward Passage. She was on a voyage from Jamaica to London.
Sion	Great Britain	The ship was lost on the coast of New Brunswick.
South Carolina	France	The whaler was lost in Dilago Bay, in the South Seas. Her crew were rescued.
South Carolina	United States	The ship foundered in the Atlantic Ocean with the loss of a crew member. she was on a voyage from Virginia to Saint Martin.
Squirrel	Great Britain	African slave trade: The ship was lost at Bonny. Her crew and 170 slaves were rescued.
St. George	Great Britain	The ship was lost off Heneaga. She was on a voyage from Jamaica to North Carolina.
St. James's Planter	Great Britain	The ship was lost near Cape Lookout, United States. She was on a voyage from Jamaica to London.
St Peter	(Kingdom of Great Britain) Guernsey	The ship was lost off Cape Bay. Her crew were rescued. She was on a voyage from Guernsey to Chaleur Bay, Newfoundland.
Sv. Loann Pretecha	Russian Empire	The vessel was wrecked on St. George Island in the Pribilof Islands sometime during or before 1791 without loss of life or cargo .
Swan	Great Britain	The ship was wrecked on Hog Island, Philadelphia. She was on a voyage from Virginia, United States to London.
Swansea	Great Britain	The ship was lost on "Quiberoon Island". She was on a voyage from New York to Newfoundland.
Two Friends	(Kingdom of Great Britain) Jersey	The ship was lost at Saint Pierre Island. She was on a voyage from Quebec to Jersey.
Two Sisters	Ireland	The ship was lost at Royal Island, Bahamas. She was on a voyage from Cork to New Providence.
United States	United States	The whaler was driven ashore and wrecked at Port Louis, Mauritius. She was on a voyage from Port Louis to the South Seas.
Vendengeur	France	The ship foundered in the Atlantic Ocean. She was on a voyage from Saint-Valery-sur-Somme to Charleston.
Yucatan	Great Britain	The ship was driven ashore at Saint Kitts.
