= Trent (ship) =

Several ships have been named Trent:

- Trent (1790 ship) was launched at Hull. She was lost on Hogland, Russia in 1791 as she was sailing from London to Saint Petersburg, Russia.
- Trent (1797 ship), of 284 tons (bm), was launched by Edward Morley, Howden. She suffered major misfortunes in 1836 and 1843, and was wrecked in 1856.

== See also ==
- HMS Trent - any one of six vessels
