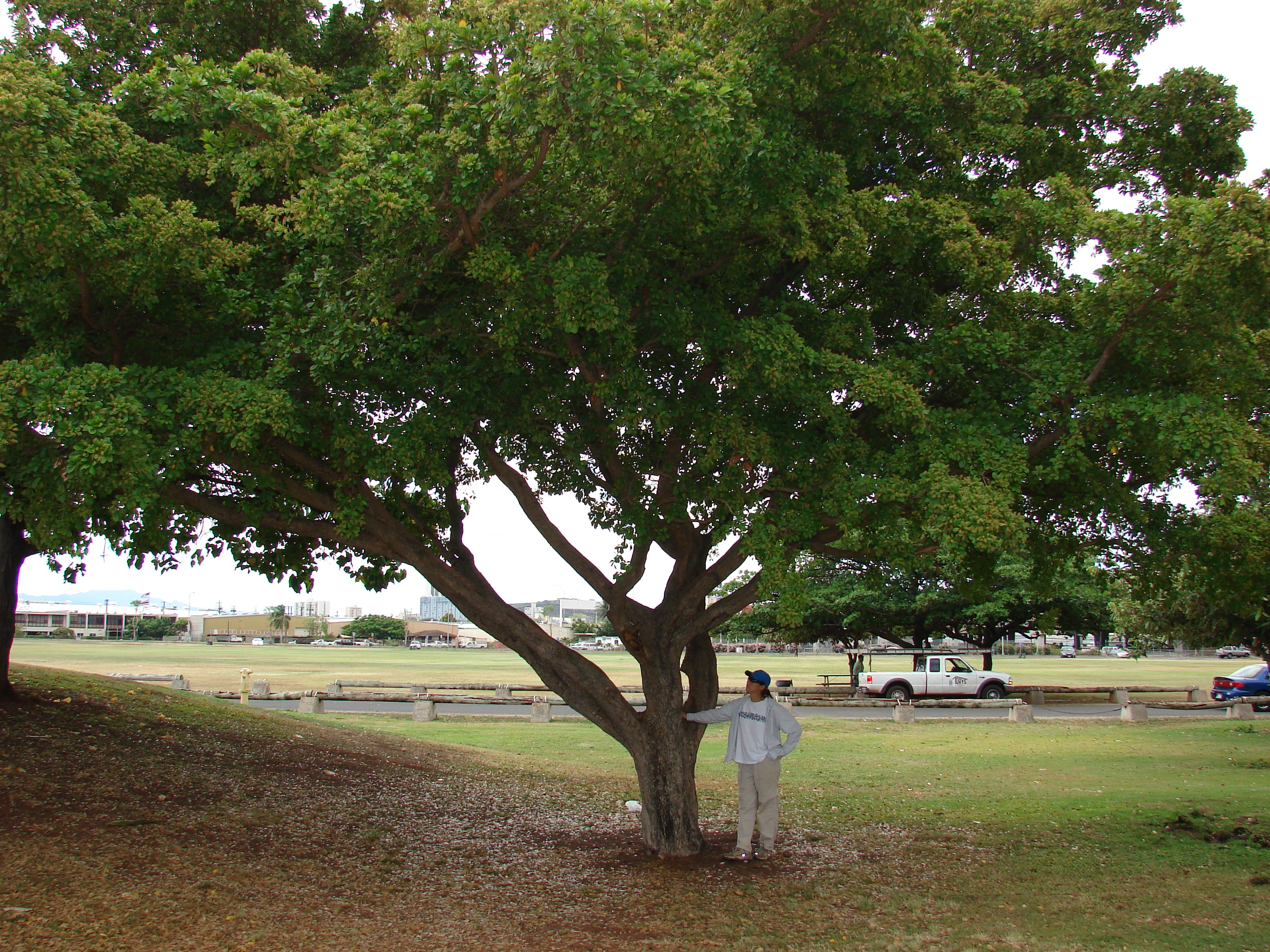

Scientific classification
- Kingdom: Plantae
- Clade: Tracheophytes
- Clade: Angiosperms
- Clade: Eudicots
- Clade: Rosids
- Order: Myrtales
- Family: Combretaceae
- Genus: Terminalia
- Species: T. buceras

Binomial name
- Terminalia buceras (L.) C.Wright

Synonyms
- Buceras bucida Crantz; Bucida buceras L.; Bucida ophiticola Bisse; Bucida palustris Borhidi & O.Muñiz; Bucida subinermis Bisse; Myrobalanus buceras (L.) Kuntze

= Terminalia buceras =

Species of tree in Combretaceae family

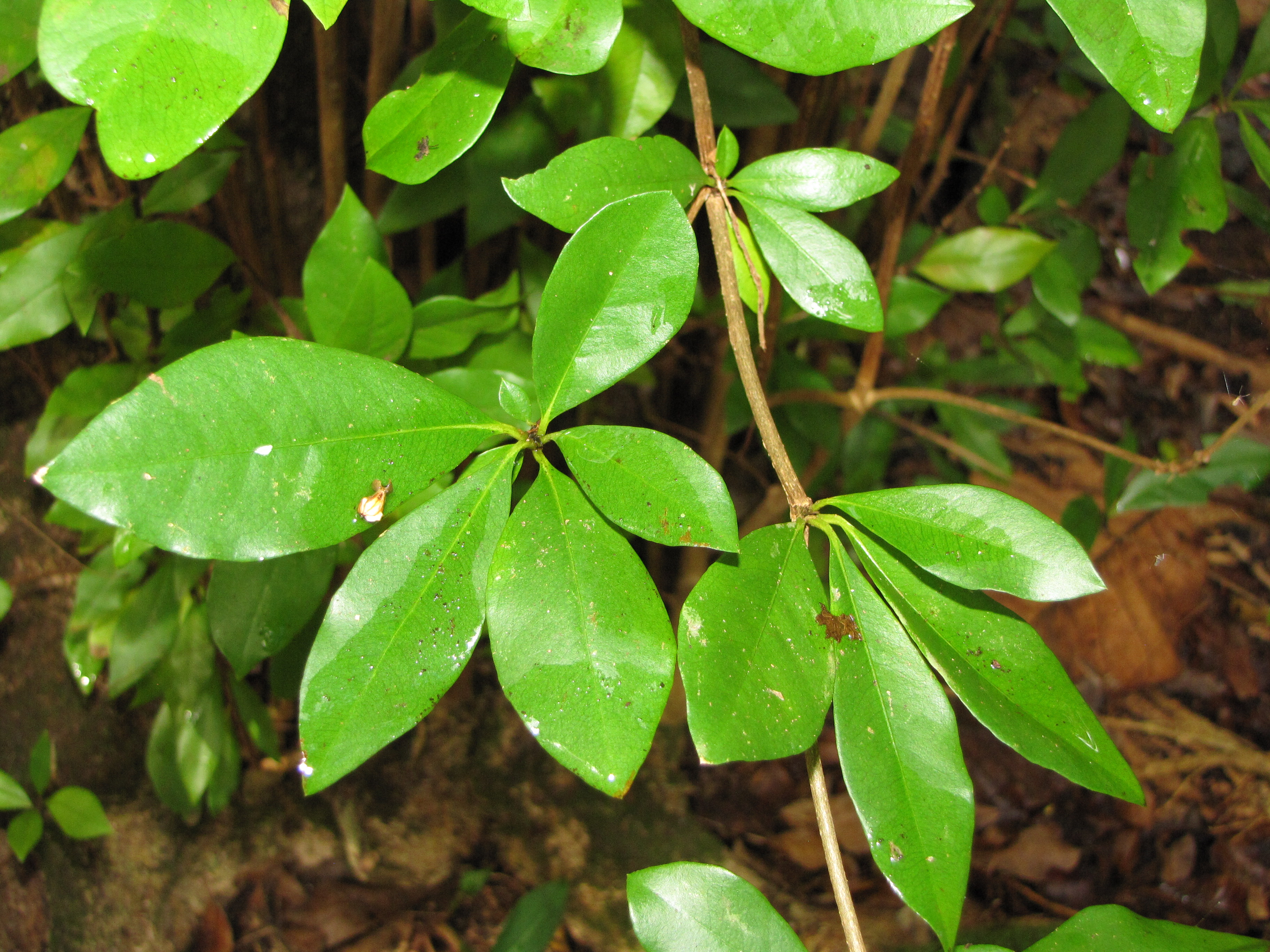
Bucida buceras leaves

Terminalia buceras is a tree in the Combretaceae family. It is known by a variety of names in English, including bullet tree, black olive tree, gregorywood (or gregory wood), Antigua whitewood, and oxhorn bucida. It is native to Mexico, Central America, the Caribbean, and northern South America. It is commonly found in coastal swamps and wet inland forests in low elevations.

== Distribution ==
The species is native to the Neotropical realm. Countries and regions in which it grows are: Colombia; Panama; Costa Rica; Venezuelan Antilles; Nicaragua; Windward Islands; Honduras; Guatemala; Mexico (Southeast, Southwest, Gulf, Central); Leeward Islands; Belize; Hispaniola (Dominican Republic, Haiti); Jamaica; Puerto Rico; Cuba; Turks-Caicos Islands; Bahamas. It is regarded as introduced in Florida and Trinidad and Tobago.

== Growth ==
To grow it prefers high sunlight and rich, moist, well drained soil. It is highly tolerant to salt, insects, fungus, wind, and air pollution. Its roots are able to dig up paving stones and damage foundations.

== Wood ==
The wood of the bullet tree is extremely hard and durable. Being highly resistant to insects and fungi, it is sometimes used for house posts or bridge timbers. The bark may be used for tanning leather due to its tannin content. It is also often used as an ornamental/shade tree.

The wood was also used for ship construction during the Age of Sail. The frame of Trelawney Planter, built in Jamaica in 1790, was constructed of bullet tree wood.
