= Revolt of the housewives =

1795 food riots during a time of dearth

The 1795 food riots are known as the revolt of the housewives, a term coined by John Lawrence Hammond and Barbara Hammond for a series of food riots and disturbances in England in 1795. They arose out of exceptional food scarcity. Women played conspicuous roles in the riots.

== Background ==
The Hammonds set the riots in the context of the enclosure of land in the period from c.1760, which removed common rights – to cultivate, or graze animals, or collect fuel – previously exercised by Yeomen, Copyholders, Cottagers and Squatters, to their great disadvantage or ruin; exacerbated by the constraints of the English Poor Laws, which served to prevent the poor from moving to or settling in other parishes. The riots occurred within the period of the French Revolution, a time in which the British ruling class had heightened concerns about the risk of revolution.

The winter of 1794–95 was exceptionally harsh: January 1795 was the coldest month ever in the Central England temperature series with an average of −3.1 °C or 26.4 °F., and great floods are reported in February on the Rivers Severn and Wye resulting from ice breakup, snowmelt and heavy rainfall. Such poor weather led to exceptional scarcity of food early in the year, precipitating a crisis that, with enclosure and the poor law, had long been in the making.

== 1795 riots ==
Scarcity of food led to riots across the country, in which women led or were conspicuous by their involvement. Rioters forced the redistribution of available food-stocks; the Hammonds' characterise them as being disciplined and of good order, and, on finding themselves "masters of their situation", the rioters set fair prices for seized food and paid the proceeds over to its original owner.

Riots involving women forcing food redistribution were reported in Aylesbury in March 1795, and in Carlisle, Ipswich, Fordingbridge, Bath, and Deddington, as well as in the counties of Wiltshire, Suffolk and Norfolk. In Seaford, East Sussex, militia brought in by magistrates to quell the riots joined with the rioters to redistribute meat and flour, for which two ringleaders among the soldiers were shot on 13 June. In Chudleigh, two mills were destroyed, albeit in this instance the Ipswich Journal speculates that men wearing petticoats were amongst the rioters.

== Responses ==
Local actions were taken by magistrates against named rioters – such as a 3-month prison sentence for Sarah Rogers of Fordingbridge, who redistributed butter belonging to Hannah Dawson at a fair price. More positively, a number of local initiatives are reported, especially in the provision of fuel at reasonable prices for poor parishioners; and more complex support such as the Speenhamland system.

National discussion turned on a number of questions, such as of diet: could the poor be persuaded to subsist on cheaper brown breads and dispense with their use of tea? It appeared that they could not. Deliberations were made into the desirability of pegging minimum wages to the cost of provisions such as by Edmund Burke (against) and Arthur Young (for); a number of magistrates benches and quarter sessions had made such a recommendation. Samuel Whitbread introduced a minimum wage bill into Parliament late in 1795, winning support from Richard Brinsley Sheridan and Charles Grey and Charles James Fox; but the bill was opposed by William Pitt the Younger, and failed to pass a second reading.

The government also undertook to bring in grains from abroad from Canada, Europe, and even Bengal.

== In popular culture ==
The Revolt of the Housewives serves as a historical backdrop to events depicted in Ken Follett's novel The Armour of Light.
