= Swallow (1805 ship) =

History

United Kingdom
- Name: Swallow
- Owner: 1805:Graham Monkhouse; 1806:John Leigh
- Acquired: 1805 by purchase of a prize
- Captured: 1807

General characteristics
- Tons burthen: 105, (bm)
- Sail plan: Brig

Swallow was launched in Spain in 1790, almost certainly under another name. She was taken in prize in 1805 and became a slaver ship in the triangular trade in enslaved people. She made two voyages carrying captives, on both of which privateers captured her.

== Career ==
Swallow first appeared in Lloyd's Register (LR) in the volume for 1805.

Year	Master	Owner	Trade	Source
1805	W.A.Dale	M'Graham	Liverpool–Africa	LR

1st enslaving voyage (1805): Captain William Aldcroft Dale sailed from Liverpool on 19 January 1805. Swallow acquired her captives at Grand Mesurado and then sailed for the West Indies. On her way she was captured and her French captors took her into Martinique. She had been carrying 150 captives.

In a process that currently remains obscure, Swallow remained or returned to British ownership.

2nd enslaving voyage (1806): Captain Joseph Vardy sailed from Liverpool on 6 September 1806. At some point her master changed to Kirkpatrick as she was reported to have arrived at Africa from Liverpool with Kirkpatrick, master. Swallow acquired captives at Gabon. On her way to the West Indies a French privateer captured Swallow and took her into Basse-Terre, Guadeloupe. Lloyd's List (LL) reported that a privateer had taken Swallow as she was sailing from Africa to the West Indies and had taken her into Gaudaloupe.

Swallow's captor was the privateer Général Ernouf, under the command of Alexis Grassin. She and her cargo were sold for 182,783 francs.

In 1806, 33 British enslaving ships were lost. Of these, 11 were lost in the Middle Passage, sailing from Africa to the West Indies. During the period 1793 to 1807, war, rather than maritime hazards or resistance by the captives, was the greatest cause of vessel losses among British slave vessels.
