= Zephyr (1790 ship) =

History

Great Britain
- Name: Zephyr
- Owner: Kensington & Co.
- Builder: Thames
- Launched: 1790
- Captured: 1798

General characteristics
- Tons burthen: 286, or 300 (bm)
- Propulsion: Sail
- Complement: 18
- Armament: 1793:8 × 6-pounder guns + 2 swivel guns; 1797:10 × 6-pounder + 2 × 12-pounder guns

Zephyr was built on the River Thames in 1790 as a West Indiaman. From c.1796 she started to serve the British East India Company (EIC) as a packet ship. However, a French privateer captured her in 1798.

== Career ==
Zephyr entered Lloyd's Register in 1791 with T. Scott, master, and trade London-St Vincent.

After the commencement of the French Revolutionary Wars in 1793, Captain Thomas Scott received a letter of marque on 9 March.

On 30 December 1795, Messrs. St Barbe, Green, and Bignell offered Zephyr, and another brig, Aurora, to the Committee of Shipping of the EIC. The next day the Committee replied that as the EIC had decided not to engage any vessels of under 400 tons burthen, it would decline the offer.

Lloyd's List reported on 11 October 1796 that Zephyr had arrived at Dover from Demerara. As she arrived in English waters she saw a brig founder at Lands End.

The next year the EIC reversed its earlier policy and engaged Zephyr as a packet. Lloyd's Register for 1797 shows her trade changing from Cork—San Domingo to London—East India.

== Loss ==
On 20 February 1798 as Zephyr was returning to Britain from Bengal and the Cape of Good Hope, the French privateer Vengeance captured her at 45°35′N 37°10′W. Zephyr, which was under the command of Captain John Scott, was no match for Vengeance, which was armed with 24 guns and had a crew of 215 men. (Note: Vengeance was 300-ton (French; "of load"), 20-gun privateer corvette commissioned in Bordeaux in October 1797. Her first cruise started in October 1797. Second cruise, Captain Limousin, with 5 officers and 74 men, lasted from circa August 1798 to circa February 1799. Her third cruise took place in 1800 under a Captain Grandier.) Vengeance sent Zephyr into Bordeaux. The EIC valued its cargo on Zephyr at £2,554.
