= Chichester (1793 ship) =

History

Great Britain
- Name: Chichester
- Owner: Benjamin Blake
- Builder: India
- Launched: 1793 (or before), India
- Fate: Possibly wrecked 1815

General characteristics
- Tons burthen: 362 or 450 (bm)
- Armament: 8 × 4-pounder guns
- Notes: Teak

Chichester was built in India in 1793 or before. She made one voyage for the British East India Company (EIC) carrying rice to Britain for the British government. She also was chartered for a naval campaign that was cancelled. She may have wrecked in 1815 at the mouth of the Hooghly River.

== Career ==
In September 1793 Captain Blake delivered a cargo of rice to Coringa, which he found was suffering from a famine. He sold his cargo below the then market price and would have sold it for less had he not been assured that his buyers were all wealthy Brahmins. Blake continued to feed 800 people daily while he was in Coringa, and on leaving left 1000 rupees of rice to feed the destitute.

Chichester made one voyage for the EICbetween 1795 and 1796. She was at Jangarall Creek, Calcutta, on 25 September 1795. Captain Blake sailed from Bengal on 1 January 1796. She carried rice on behalf of the British government which was importing grain to address high prices for wheat in Britain following a poor harvest.

The British government had purchased the rice to address high prices for wheat in Britain following a poor harvest.

Chichester was at Madras on 8 January and Saint Helena on 30 March. She left from there on 3 April, and stopped at Falmouth. She arrived at Purfleet on 18 June. She was carrying a cargo of rice from Bengal. She entered Lloyd's Register in 1797 with B. Blake, owner and master, and trade London–East Indies.

She returned to India where the EIC chartered her to serve as a transport, one of about 15, in a planned attack on Manila. The EIC chartered her from 20 June 1797 to 20 December at sicca rupees 6000 per month. Including the cost of the construction of a magazine, the cost was sicca rupees 86,815-9-4. There were also more modest sundry charges for provisions. However, the British Government cancelled the invasion following a peace treaty with Spain and the EIC released the vessels it had engaged.

Chichester is last listed in Lloyd's Register and the Register of Shipping in 1800, with unchanged information. She also is absent from lists in 1803 and 1809 of vessels registered at Bombay or Calcutta.

== Fate ==
One source reports that Chichester, of 660 tons (bm), was lost in 1815 at the mouth of the Hooghly River on the Mizen Sand (21°40′N 87°58′E).

Note: The Chichester of the present article is NOT the vessel that became a transport for the British Royal Navy and that was wrecked in 1811. The vessel that was wrecked was HMS Chichester, a French vessel the Royal Navy had captured in 1806 and turned into an armed storeship.
