= Reliance (1804 ship) =

History

United Kingdom
- Owner: Cobb, Taylor, & Edwards
- Acquired: c.1804 by purchase of a prize
- Fate: Scuttled 24 June 1804

General characteristics
- Tons burthen: 160 (bm)
- Complement: 20
- Armament: 10 × 9-pounder guns

Reliance was built in France in 1790 and was registered in 1804 at Bristol. She left Bristol on a voyage as a slave ship in the triangular trade in enslaved people. Her crew scuttled her in June before having embarked any slaves.

Captain James Gordon acquired a letter of marque on 16 March 1804. He sailed from Bristol on 30 April (or 4 May), bound from Gambia to the West Indies. In 1804, 147 vessels sailed from British ports, bound on voyages to transport enslaved people. Three of these vessels sailed from Bristol.

On 28 December Lloyd's List (LL) reported that Reliance, Gordon, master, had been lost in the Gambia River.

In 1804, 30 British vessels on voyages to transport enslaved people were lost, Eight of these vessels were lost on the coast of Africa.

In December 1807, Captain Gordon sued Reliance's insurers for lost commission and privileges due to her loss when he scuttled her by fire. Reliance had arrived on the African coast in mid-June 1804. On 24 June a French privateer of superior force appeared. When it became clear that Reliance could neither fight nor escape, Gordon and his men fired her guns into her hold to hole her and then set fire to her to prevent the enemy from capturing her. He and his men then escaped ashore in her long boat. The court found for the plaintiff, Gordon, as the insurance policy expressly covered loss by fire.
