= General Medows (1790 ship) =

History

Great Britain
- Name: General Medows, or General Meadows
- Builder: Surat (Note: One source gives her origin as Calcutta, but the best source on vessels built there makes no mention of her.)
- Launched: 1790 (Note: One source gives her launch year as 1790, and another source gives it as 1795,5 but she was already sailing by then.)
- Fate: Last listed 1802

General characteristics
- Tons burthen: 340, or 575 (bm)
- Propulsion: Sail
- Notes: Teak

General Medows (or General Meadows) was built at Surat in 1790. She was a country ship, that is she traded in the Far East, but did not sail west of the Cape of Good Hope without permission of the British East India Company (EIC). She made two voyages for the EIC and then disappears from currently readily available online resources.

EIC voyage #1 (1795): The ship arrivals and departure (SAD) data in Lloyd's List for 22 May 1795 showed General Meadows, Lloyd, master, in the harbour at Canton, having come from Bengal. She sailed from China on 1 May 1795, stopped at Penang, and arrived at Calcutta on 2 August.

EIC voyage #2 (1795–1796): General Medows loaded rice at Calcutta on behalf of the British government, which was importing grain to address high prices for wheat in Britain following a poor harvest. Captain William MacDonald sailed from Calcutta on 8 January 1796 and on 23 May arrived at Long Reach.

General Meadows entered Lloyd's Register for 1796 with McDonald, owner and master, and trade London–India. She is last listed in Lloyd's Register in 1802 with unchanged data.
