= Trelawney Planter (1790 ship) =

History

Great Britain
- Name: Trelawney Planter
- Namesake: Trelawny, Jamaica
- Launched: 1790, Jamaica
- Fate: Lost early December 1811

General characteristics
- Tons burthen: 280, or 290, or 305 (bm)
- Armament: 2 × 6-pounder guns (1797)
- Notes: Frame constructed of bullet tree wood; pitch pine bottom, deck, & sides.

Trelawney Planter was built in Jamaica in 1790. She sailed as a West Indiaman, sailing between London and Jamaica. She was not listed in Lloyd's Register (LR) between 1797 and 1802. She re-entered LR in 1802. She continued to trade, lastly trading between Hull and London. She was lost early in December 1811.

== Career ==
Captain James M'Donald sailed from Martha Brae on 21 July 1790, bound for London. Adverse winds forced him to sail via the Gulf of Mexico. On 5 August he sighted a Spanish fleet astern, consisting of several merchantmen and two warships as escort. In the evening of 7 August Trelawney Planter passed ahead of the fleet when a frigate, later reported to be Roussillon, of 36 guns, and under the command of Captain Don Francisco Vidal, came up and ordered M'Donald to come aboard. When he did so, Captain Vidal berated him for sailing in Spanish waters. M'Donald replied that as the passage consisted of Spanish territory on the one side (Florida), and British territory on the other (the Bahamas), he was entitled to sail there. Vidal then caused M.Donald to be confined all night between two guns on the quarterdeck. Next morning Vidal had M'Donald tied up on the Fo'csle in the burning sun for three and a half hours. Vidal sent two officers and seventeen men, including a Black man to act as interpreter, to Trelawney Planter to search her. They returned, having found nothing indicating that she might engage in piracy, or smuggling of contraband. The Spaniards finally released M'Donald, his men, and Trelawney Planter at about 1pm on 8 August. (Note: There is a much fuller account of the incident in The Times. The Times shortly thereafter published a letter from someone claiming to have been an American captain of a brig that M'Donald had captured while M'Donald had been captain of HM armed ship Carolina during the American Revolutionary War. The letter writer praised M'Donald's treatment of his prisoners. However, as Admiralty records show the captain of Carolina to have been Mackay, not M'Donald, the letter's testimony is not well-established.)

Trelawney Planter arrived at Gravesend on 18 September 1790. She first appeared in Lloyd's Register (LR) in the volume for 1791.

| Year | Master | Owner | Trade | Source |
|---|---|---|---|---|
| 1791 | M'Donald | R.Shedden | London–Jamaica | LR |
| 1797 | M'Donald | R.Shedden | London–Jamaica | LR |

Trelawney Planter disappeared from Lloyd's Register between 1797 and 1802; her disposition during this period is between currently obscure. In 1801 Shedden sailed a second, slightly larger Trelawney Planter.

Trelawney Planter re-appeared in the 1802 volume of Lloyd's Register.

| Year | Master | Owner | Trade | Source |
|---|---|---|---|---|
| 1802 | J.Crear | Walker & Co. | Leith–Tobago | LR |

The Caledonian Mercury reported in November 1802 that Trelawney Planter had put into Bantry Bay while sailing from Tobago to Leith. Captain Crear and several of her crew had died at Tobago. Lloyd's Register did not update her entry for some years. An advertisement in the Caledonian Mercury in February 1806 stated that she was under the command of James Gunn and that she intended to sail from Plymouth to Tobago, leaving with the Plymouth convoy due to sail on 1 March.

| Year | Master | Owner | Trade | Source |
|---|---|---|---|---|
| 1806 | J.Crear; J.Gunn | Walker & Co. | Leith–Tobago | LR |
| 1807 | J.Gunn; Wiseman | Walker & Co. | Leith–Tobago | LR |
| 1809 | Wiseman; J.Fell | Lind & Co. | Leith–Tobago | LR |
| 1810 | J.Fell | Robinson | Hull–London | LR |
| 1811 | J.Fell; Simmons | Robinson | Hull–London | LR |

== Fate ==
Trelwaney Planters, Simmonds, master, was lost near Cape Breton early in December 1811. She had been travelling from Pictou to Hull.
