= Trent (1790 ship) =

History

Great Britain
- Builder: Hull
- Launched: 1790
- Fate: Wrecked 1791

General characteristics
- Tons burthen: 298 (bm)

Trent was launched at Hull in 1790. Her master was J.Maw, her owner was Hammond, and her trade was Hull–Petersburg. Trent was lost on Hogland, Russia as she was sailing from London to Saint Petersburg, Russia. Her entry in Lloyd's Register carried the annotation "Lost".
