= Triumph =

Triumph may refer to:

== Geography ==
- Triumph, Idaho, US
- Triumph, Illinois, US
- Triumph, Louisiana, US
- Triumph Township, Custer County, Nebraska, US
- Triumph Township, Pennsylvania, US
- Triumph, Guyana

== Business and transportation ==
- Triumph (TWN), a defunct German motorcycle manufacturer
- Triumph Cycle Co. Ltd., a British bicycle brand
- Triumph Engineering Co Ltd, a defunct British motorcycle manufacturer
- Triumph Group, an aerospace manufacturing and repair company
- Triumph Hotels, an American hotel brand
- Triumph International, an underwear manufacturer
- Triumph Motor Company, a British car manufacturer
- Triumph Motorcycles Ltd, a current British motorcycle manufacturer
- Norton Villiers Triumph, a defunct British motorcycle manufacturer

=== Ships ===
- Carnival Triumph, a cruise ship
- MS Triumph, a ferry
- Triumph (sternwheeler), an 1890s steamboat
- HMS Triumph
- USS Triumph (disambiguation)
- USNS Triumph

== Arts and entertainment ==
=== Books ===
- Triumph (magazine), a defunct Catholic publication
- Triumph (Nigeria), an English-language newspaper
- Triumph (comics), a former Justice League member
- Triumph, a 1993 alternate history novel by Ben Bova set at the end of World War II

=== Film and TV ===
- Triumph Studios, a computer game development company based in the Netherlands
- Triumph Films, a division of Sony Pictures Entertainment
- Triumph (1917 film), a silent drama starring Lon Chaney, Sr.
- Triumph (1924 film), a silent drama directed by Cecil B. DeMille
- Triumph (2021 film), a sports drama
- Triumph (2024 film), a Bulgarian black comedy
- Triumph the Insult Comic Dog, a puppet character best known for mocking celebrities
- "Triumph" (Rome), a 2005 television episode

=== Music ===
- Triumph (band), a Canadian hard rock band

==== Albums ====
- Triumph (Triumph album), 1976
- Triumph (The Jacksons album), 1980
- Triumph (Philip Bailey album), 1986
- Triumph, a 2008 album by Circle (Finnish band)
- Triumph, a 2010 EP by Lorna Shore

==== Songs ====
- "Triumph" (song), a 1997 rap single by the Wu-Tang Clan
- "Triumph", a song by XXXTentacion from the 2019 album Bad Vibes Forever
- "Triumph", a song by Ben&Ben from the 2024 album The Traveller Across Dimensions

== Other uses ==
- Roman triumph, a celebration for a victorious military commander in ancient Rome
- A scuppernong (large muscadine Vitis rotundifolia) cultivar
- Triomphe, a trick-taking 15th century card game
- BC Triumph Lyubertsy, a Russian basketball team

== See also ==
- Triumf (disambiguation)
- Trionfo, a form of festivity in Renaissance Italy
