= French ship Le Triomphant =

Eight ships of the French Navy have borne the name Le Triomphant, Triomphant or Triomphante ("triumphant"):

- Triomphant (1667), a ship of the line launched as Princesse ("Princess"), renamed Triomphant in 1671, and Constant ("reliable one") in 1678.
- Triomphant (1675), a ship of the line launched as Constant and renamed in 1678
- Triomphant (1693), a ship of the line
- Triomphant (1779), a ship of the line
- Triomphant (1809), a ship of the line
- Triomphante, a La Galissonnière-class ironclad launched in 1877 and sold in 1903
- Le Triomphant, a Fantasque-class destroyer (1931–1957)
- Le Triomphant (S616), lead ship of the Triomphant class of strategic missile submarines
Ships of the French Navy named Triomphant
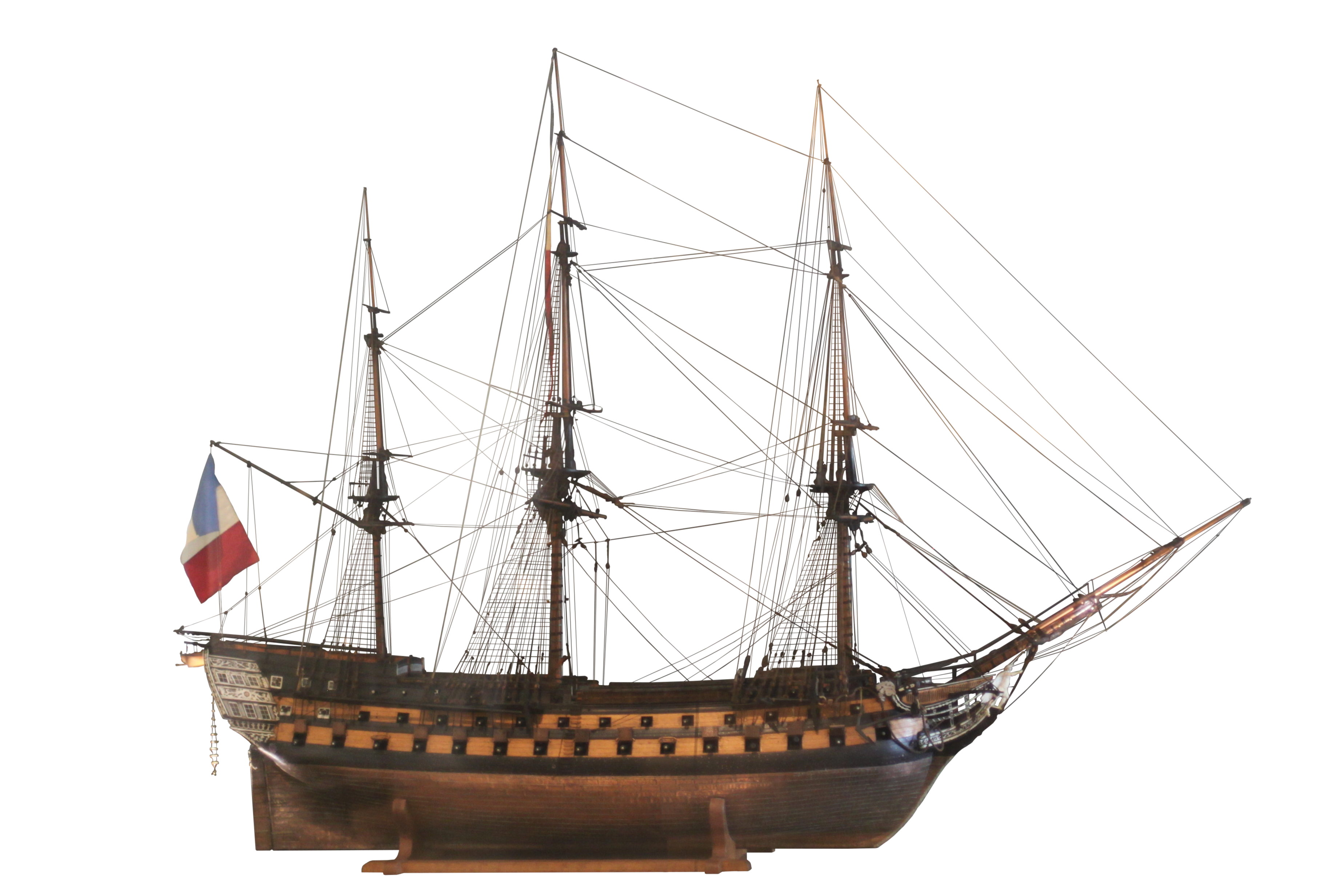
Triomphant (1809)

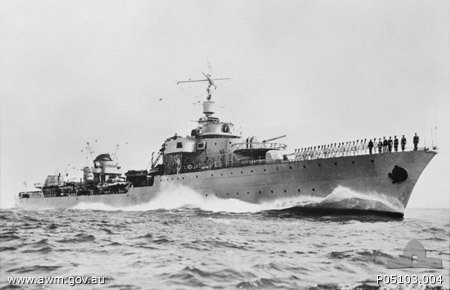
Le Triomphant (1931)

== See also ==
- HMS Triumph
- USNS Triumph
- USS Triumph (AM-323)
- Le Triomphant (1797), privateer

== Bibliography ==
- Roche, Jean-Michel (2005). Dictionnaire des bâtiments de la flotte de guerre française de Colbert à nos jours. Vol. 1. Group Retozel-Maury Millau. pp. 445–446. ISBN 978-2-9525917-0-6. OCLC 165892922.
- Roche, Jean-Michel (2005). Dictionnaire des bâtiments de la flotte de guerre française de Colbert à nos jours. Vol. 2. Group Retozel-Maury Millau. ISBN 978-2-9525917-0-6. OCLC 165892922.
