= List of ship launches in 1667 =

The list of ship launches in 1667 includes a chronological list of some ships launched in 1667.

Date	Ship	Class	Builder	Location	Country	Notes
15 January	Comte	Third rate	Nissard	Toulon	Kingdom of France	For French Navy.
January	Jonge Prins te Paard	Sixth rate frigate		Zeeland	Dutch Republic	For Dutch Republic Navy.
January	Dunkerquois	Fourth rate frigate	Debast	Dunkerque	Kingdom of France	For French Navy.
February	Toulon	Fourth rate	Gédéon Rodolphe	Toulon	Kingdom of France	For French Navy.
30 March	St David	Fourth rate	J Batt	Lydney	England	For Royal Navy.
March	Provençal	Fourth rate	Gédéon Rodolphe	Toulon	Kingdom of France	For French Navy.
March	Monmouth	Third rate	Phineas Pett, Chatham Dockyard	Chatham	England	For Royal Navy.
March	Princesse	Second rate ship of the line	Jean-Pierre Brun	Soubise	Kingdom of France	For French Navy.
23 November	Giove Fulminante	Third rate ship of the line	Paoli di Ottavia Corso	Venice	Republic of Venice	For Venetian Navy.
6 December	Resolution	Third rate ship of the line	Anthony Deane	Harwich	England	For Royal Navy.
16 December	Costanza Guerriera	Third rate ship of the line	Iseppo di Piero de Pieri	Venice	Republic of Venice	For Venetian Navy.
Unknown date	Brak	Fifth rate frigate			Dutch Republic	For Dutch Republic Navy.
Unknown date	Caritas	Merchant ship.			Sweden	For unknown owner.
Unknown date	Flamand	Fifth Rate	Howens Hendrick	Dunkerque	Kingdom of France	For French Navy.
Unknown date	Groenwijf	Fifth rate frigate	Jan van Rheenen, Amsterdam Navy Yard	Amsterdam	Dutch Republic	For Dutch Republic Navy.
Unknown date	Hertog van York	Sixth rate			Dutch Republic	For Dutch Republic Navy.
Unknown date	Justina van Nassau	Third rate	Wouter Sybrantssen	Enkhuizen	Dutch Republic	For Dutch Republic Navy.
Unknown date	Kloek	Sixth rate		Dunkerque	Kingdom of France	For Dutch Republic Navy.
Unknown date	Lis	Third rate ship of the line	Laurent Hubac	Brest	Kingdom of France	For French Navy.
Unknown date	Mars	Third rate ship of the line	Henrik Bremer	Lübeck	Lübeck	For Royal Swedish Navy.
Unknown date	Oranje	Third rate	Salomon Janszoon van den Tempel	Rotterdam	Dutch Republic	For Dutch Republic Navy.
Unknown date	Oudkarspel	Fifth rate frigate	Jan van Rheenen, Amsterdam Naval Yard	Amsterdam	Dutch Republic	For Dutch Republic Navy.
Unknown date	Solen	Second rate ship of the line		Lübeck	Lübeck	For Royal Swedish Navy.
Unknown date	Unity	Fourth rate			Dutch Republic	For Dutch Republic Navy.
Unknown date	Venus	Third rate ship of the line		Karlshamn	Kingdom of Sweden	For Royal Swedish Navy.
Unknown date	Voorzichtigheid	Second rate	Salomon Janszoon van den Tempel	Rotterdam	Dutch Republic	For Dutch Republic Navy.
Unknown date	Vrijheid	Second rate	Salomon Janszoon van den Tempel	Rotterdam	Dutch Republic	For Dutch Republic Navy.
Unknown date	Wapen van Hoorn	First rate			Dutch Republic	For Dutch Republic Navy.
Unknown date	Windhond	Sixth rate			Dutch Republic	For Dutch Republic Navy.
Unknown date	Windhond	Fifth rate frigate			Dutch Republic	For Dutch Republic Navy.
Unknown date	Woerden	Second rate			Dutch Republic	For Dutch Republic Navy.
