= HMS Triumph =

Ten ships of the Royal Navy have been named HMS Triumph. Another was planned, but renamed before being launched:

- English ship Triumph (1562) was a 68-gun galleon built in 1561. She was rebuilt in 1596, and sold in 1618.
- English ship Triumph (1623) was a 44-gun ship launched in 1623 and broken up in 1687.
- HMS Triumph (1698) was a 90-gun second-rate ship of the line launched in 1698. She was renamed HMS Prince in 1714, rebuilt in 1750 and broken up in 1773.
- HMS Triumph (1739) was an 18-gun sloop, formerly the Spanish San Cristóbal (1735), (alias Triunfo). She was captured in 1739 and foundered in 1740.
- HMS Triumph (1764) was a 74-gun third-rate ship of the line launched in 1764. She was used for harbour service from 1813 and was broken up in 1850.
- HMS Triumph was to have been a 91-gun screw propelled Bulwark-class second rate. She was renamed HMS Prince Consort (1862) before her launch in 1862 as a Prince Consort-class armoured frigate.
- HMS Triumph (1870) was a Swiftsure-class battleship launched in 1870. She was renamed HMS Tenedos in 1904, being used as a depot ship, and then a training ship. She was renamed HMS Indus IV in 1912, and HMS Algiers in 1915. She was sold in 1921.
- HMS Triumph (1903) was a Swiftsure-class battleship launched in 1903 and sunk by U-21 in 1915.
- HMS Triumph (N18) was a T-class submarine launched in 1938 and sunk in 1942.
- HMS Triumph (R16) was a Colossus-class light fleet aircraft carrier launched in 1944. She was converted to a heavy repair ship in 1964 and was scrapped in 1981.
- HMS Triumph (S93) is a Trafalgar-class fleet submarine launched in 1990 in service until 2024.

== Battle honours ==
- Armada, 1588
- Dover, 1652
- Kentish Knock, 1652
- Portland, 1653
- Gabbard, 1653
- Scheveningen, 1653
- Lowestoft, 1665
- Four Days' Battle, 1666
- Orfordness, 1666
- Sole Bay, 1672
- Schooneveld, 1673
- Texel, 1673
- Cornwallis's Retreat, 1795
- Camperdown, 1797
- Dardanelles, 1915
- Malta Convoys, 1941
- Mediterranean, 1941
- Korea, 1950

== See also ==
- French ship Triomphant
- USS Triumph
- USNS Triumph
