= Triumf =

Triumf may refer to:

- TRIUMF, Canada's national particle accelerator centre
- 14959 TRIUMF, a minor planet
- S-400 Triumf, a Russian anti-aircraft weapon system developed in the 1990s
- Triumf Riza (1979–2007), Kosovo police officer and member of an elite protection unit
- CS Triumf Bârca, a Romanian professional football club

== See also ==
- Triumph (disambiguation)
