= Hotel Belleclaire =

Hotel in Manhattan, New York

Belleclaire Hotel
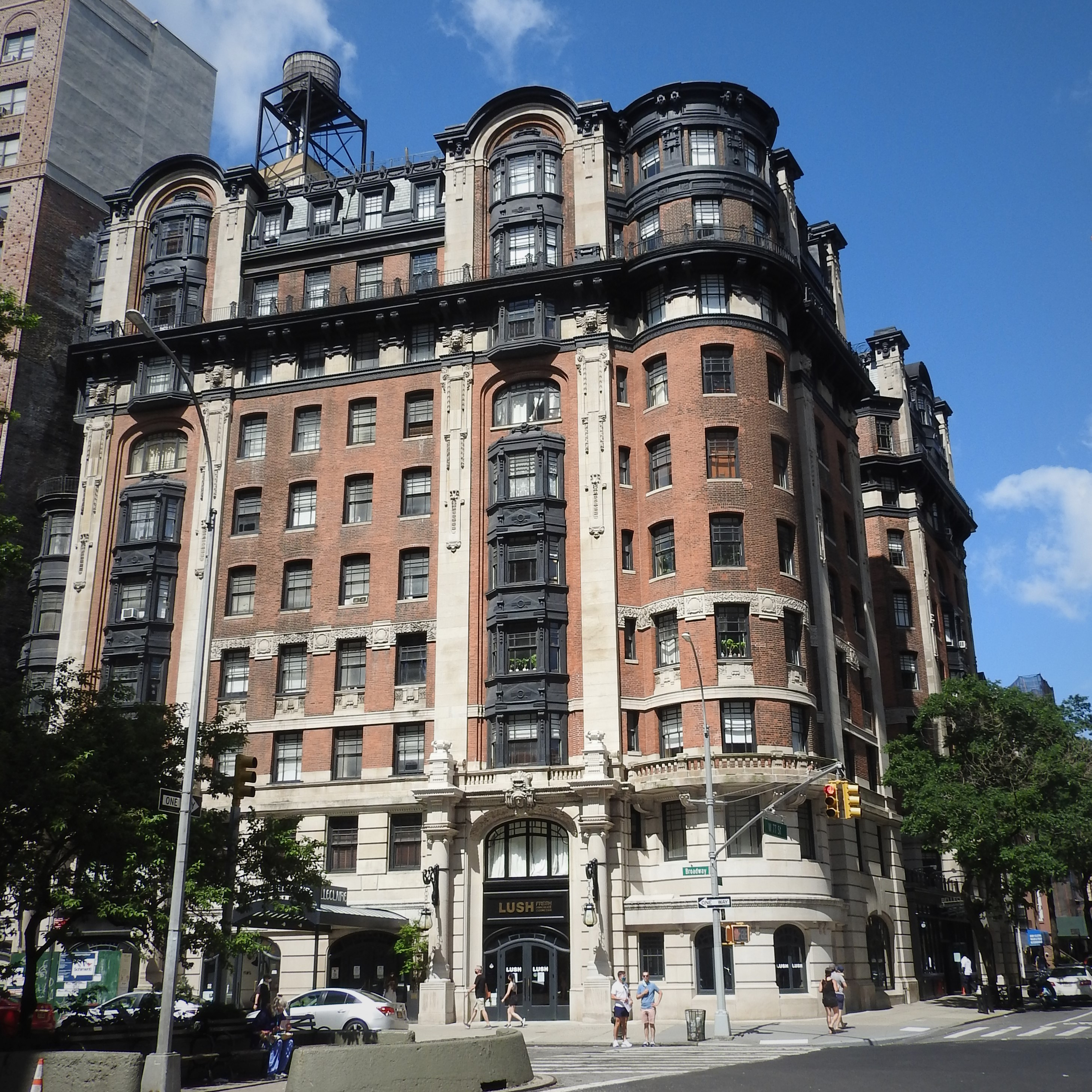

General information
- Architectural style: Art Nouveau and Secession
- Location: 2175 Broadway, New York, NY, 10024
- Coordinates: 40°46′57″N 73°58′52″W
- Construction started: 1901
- Opening: January 12, 1903
- Owner: Lophijo Realty Corp.
- Operator: Triumph Hotels

Technical details
- Floor count: 10

Design and construction
- Architect: Emery Roth
- Developer: Albert Saxe

Other information
- Number of rooms: 262

Website
- Official website

New York City Landmark
- Designated: February 10, 1987
- Reference no.: 1507

The Hotel Belleclaire (also the Belleclaire Hotel) is a hotel at 2175 Broadway, on the corner with West 77th Street, on the Upper West Side of Manhattan in New York City, United States. Constructed between 1901 and 1903 as one of several apartment hotels along Broadway on the Upper West Side, the Belleclaire was one of the first large buildings designed by architect Emery Roth. Its design incorporates elements of the Art Nouveau and Secession styles. The hotel is a New York City designated landmark.

The hotel building is 10 stories tall. Its facade is largely made of red brick with ornamentation made of limestone, metal, and terracotta. The limestone base is two stories high and contains a main entrance on Broadway; above the base, the building contains light courts facing north and south. The hotel's exterior includes a curved corner facing both Broadway and 77th Street, as well as a two-story mansard roof with arches. The hotel originally contained several ground-floor amenity areas for guests, each designed in a different style, although most of these spaces were demolished in the mid-20th century. The upper floors originally were divided into apartments with one to three rooms each. These apartments have been rearranged over the years into 262 guestrooms.

The hotel was developed by Albert Saxe, who had previously hired Roth to design another building on the Upper West Side. The hotel formally opened on January 12, 1903, and was originally an upscale apartment hotel, with several operators during its first two decades. The Belleclaire's ground-story rooms were replaced with shops in the 1920s, and the hotel had lost its high-class reputation by the 1930s. Following a series of modifications in the mid-20th century, the building started to physically deteriorate due to a lack of maintenance, and the Belleclaire became a single room occupancy hotel. Amid an increase in tourism to New York City, Shimmie Horn began operating the hotel in 1999 and renovated it into a boutique hotel. As of 2014, the hotel is operated by Triumph Hotels.

== Site ==
The Belleclaire is located at 2175 Broadway, at the southwest corner with 77th Street, on the Upper West Side of Manhattan in New York City, United States. It occupies the eastern end of the city block bounded by Broadway to the east, 77th Street to the north, West End Avenue to the west, and 76th Street to the south. The hotel has an alternate address of 250 West 77th Street. The land lot covers 13,574 ft^{2} (1,261.1 m^{2}). The building has frontage of 105.5 feet (32.2 m) on Broadway and 119.1 feet (36.3 m) on 77th Street, and it measures 146 feet (45 m) long along its southern lot line. Nearby buildings include the Astor to the south, the West End Collegiate Church to the west, and the Collegiate School and the Apthorp to the north.

Before European colonization of modern-day New York City, the site was part of the hunting grounds of the Wecquaesgeek Native American tribe. After the British established the Province of New York, the area became part of the "Thousand Acre Tract", owned by several English and Dutch settlers, in 1667. The land between 73rd and 77th streets was part of the estate of Cornelius Dyckman Jr. and remained in the family through the end of the 18th century. While the Manhattan street grid was laid out as part of the Commissioners' Plan of 1811, the neighborhood remained undeveloped through the late 19th century; the section of 77th Street west of modern-day Broadway remained unpaved as late as 1890. Developers began erecting large apartment buildings in the area by the end of the 1890s.

== Architecture ==
The Hotel Belleclaire was one of the first buildings designed by Hungarian-American architect Emery Roth, who, at the time of the hotel's construction, worked for the firm Stein, Cohn & Roth. It contains elements of the Art Nouveau and Secession styles. This contrasted with other large buildings in the area at the time, such as the Ansonia and the Dorilton, which were designed in the Beaux-Arts style. The Belleclaire's design also contrasted with both Roth's earlier Saxony apartments, which contained flatter ornamentation, and his later work, which was usually designed in the Italian Renaissance style. Architectural writer Paul Goldberger of The New York Times wrote that, in the design of the Belleclaire, "it is clear that the architect, who was under 30 when the building was designed, was still seeking style with which he could feel fully comfortable".

=== Facade ===
The Belleclaire is 10 stories tall. At the time of its construction in 1903, the Belleclaire was considered an early skyscraper. Despite his unfamiliarity with skyscraper technology at the time of the hotel's construction, Roth quickly learned how to design high-rise buildings after designing the Belleclaire. The hotel contains two light courts facing southward, as well as a recessed courtyard facing northward. This effectively divided the Belleclaire into five wings: three facing south and two facing north. The northeastern corner of the hotel building, at Broadway and 77th Street, contains a rounded tower, and the southeastern corner of the building is also curved.

The facade is largely made of red brick with ornamentation made of limestone, metal, and terracotta. This contrasted with later buildings by Roth's firm (including the San Remo), which generally contained buff-brick and limestone facades. Both the Broadway and 77th Street elevations of the facade are divided horizontally into three sections: a two-story base, a six-story midsection, and a two-story capital. the third through seventh stories are largely clad with brick; and the ninth and tenth stories form a mansard roof. The southern and eastern elevations are largely clad in plain brick and contain windows; the southern elevation is a party wall abutting another building.

==== Base ====
The base is clad with rusticated blocks of limestone. On Broadway, the original windows at ground level are recessed within elliptical arches and are designed in the Art Nouveau style, with curved mullions and muntins. The Broadway elevation also contained two double-height arches; one arch was the main entrance, while the other led to a restaurant. The main entrance was relocated to 77th Street in the 1920s when the more valuable Broadway frontage was converted to storefronts, but it was restored in 2018. Both arches are topped by copestones and flanked by an engaged column on either side, and there are leafs carved into the soffit of each arch. These engaged columns support pilasters that flank these bays on the upper floors. There was originally a balustrade above each entrance. The second story contains asymmetrical, rectangular sash windows, with twelve panes on top and three on the bottom.

==== Upper stories ====
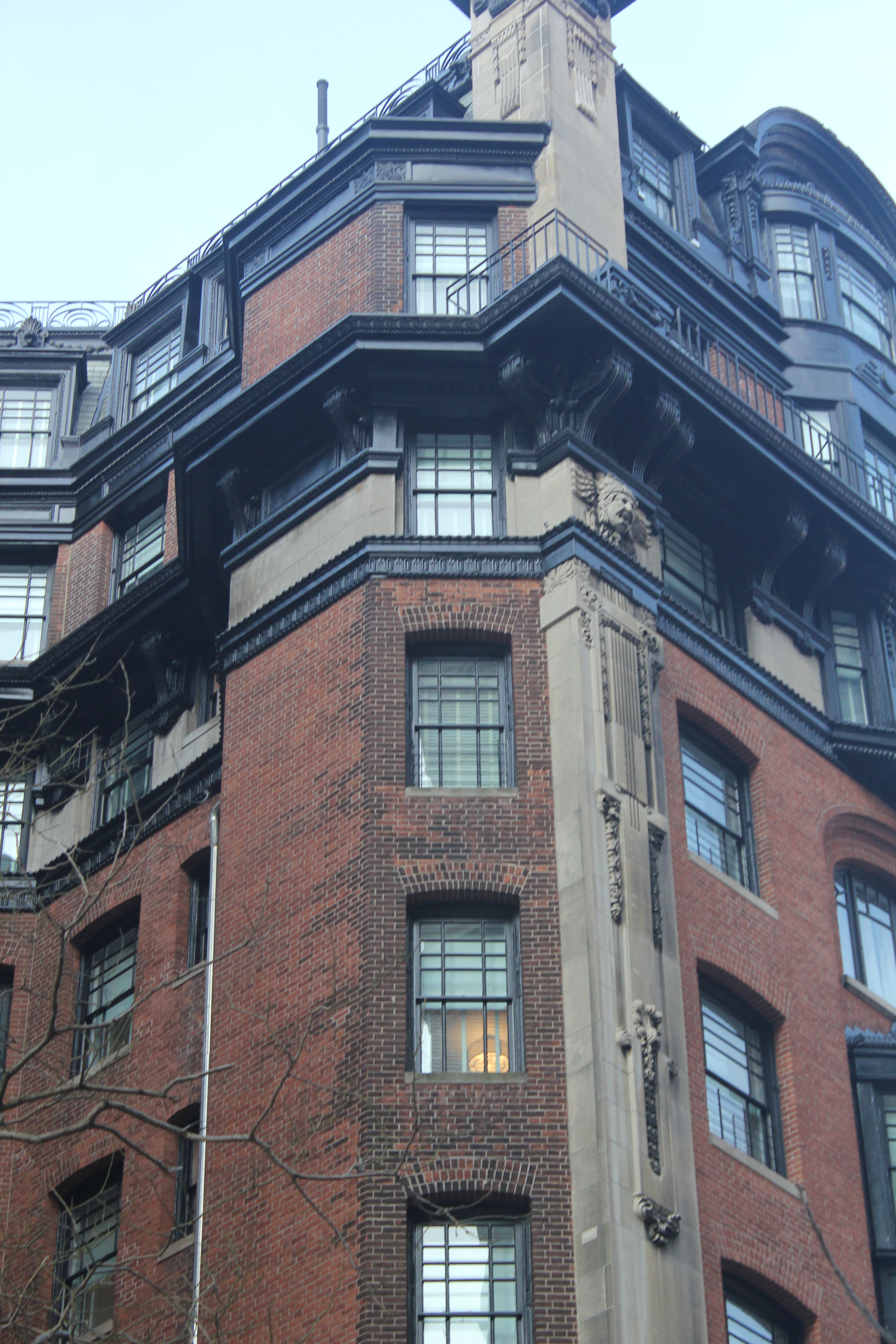
Detail of the upper portion of the facade on 77th Street

The third through seventh stories comprise the central portion of the facade and are largely clad with brick. On the fourth story, there are stone spandrels and a horizontal band course above the windows. The Broadway elevation is divided vertically into six bays. In the four central bays, the third and fourth stories have rectangular windows, while the fifth through seventh stories contain arched windows. The two outer bays are flanked by stone pilasters (which depict Native American heads and pendants) and contain oriel windows on the third to sixth stories, as well as an elliptical arch at the seventh story. Above the seventh-story arched windows, the pilasters in the outer bays are connected by round arches made of stone. The eighth story contains rectangular windows; between each set of windows are two brackets, which support a balustrade above. The ninth story contains a brick facade with rectangular windows, while the tenth story is placed with a mansard roof and contains dormer windows. The two outermost bays have double-height arches.

The 77th Street elevation is made of similar materials to the Broadway elevation, but the courtyard divides the 77th Street elevation into two sections. The courtyard is a polygonal space with chamfered corners, flanked by wings facing 77th Street on either side. Within the courtyard, three bays of windows on each story face 77th Street. A one-story entrance pavilion was built within the courtyard in the 20th century. To the east of the courtyard (on the left, as seen from across the street) is a two-bay-wide wing flanked by pilasters. To the west (right) of the courtyard is a three-bay-wide wing; the two outer bays are flanked by stone pilasters, while the center bay includes an oriel window and a seventh-story elliptical arch. A curving metal rail is installed above the western wing. The corner of Broadway and 77th Street was originally topped by a cupola, which was removed in the 1950s.

=== Features ===
When the hotel opened, the ground story contained public rooms and hotel offices, while the upper stories contained apartments. The New York City government had approved the use of steel-skeleton superstructures in 1894, less than a decade prior to the Belleclaire's construction, and so the hotel was one of the city's earlier buildings with a steel skeleton. (Note: The earliest such building was the American Surety Building in Lower Manhattan.) The Belleclaire was intended as a "fireproof" structure; as such, a steel wall rose the entire height of the building, adjoining an enclosed emergency stairwell. The hotel contained a refrigeration plant with ice boxes on each floor, as well as three 100 hp (75 kW) power generators. There was a rooftop garden overlooking the Hudson River, which originally hosted vaudeville performances for guests. The Belleclaire also originally had a collection of paintings valued at $40,000 (equivalent to $1,433,000 in 2025). Two passenger elevators, a freight elevator, and a mail chute served the entire hotel.

==== Public areas ====
Originally, a portico of large marble columns led to a rotunda and offices at ground level. A corridor ran the entire length of the ground level, and several rooms led off this corridor, each designed in a different style. These included a Louis XV-styled women's dining room; an Italian Renaissance-styled palm room; a Moorish-style private dining room; a Flemish-style cafe; a billiards room; and a library. The palm room had marble walls and a large glass dome, while the library contained a collection of literature curated by two local publishing houses. There was a writing room, as well as a men's cafe with stock tickers; The New York Times wrote in 2003 that the tickers were "the equivalent of today's wireless Internet access". The ground floor also contained space for a florist, a cigar store, a newsstand, telephones, and telegraph offices. In the mid-20th century, most of the public rooms were demolished to make way for retail.

By the 2000s, the Belleclaire did not have any public rooms except for its check-in desk. The lobby was restored to its original design in the 2010s. The lobby contains wood-paneled walls; near the elevators, pieces of marble are set into the wall. The lobby is divided into two sections and contains a bar and open seating areas. The main part of the lobby contains a full-height cabinet with Roth memorabilia, as well as a freestanding lobby. The elevators and seating areas are separated by glass display cases with typewriters and other artifacts from the early 20th century. The walls also contain carved wooden doors, as well as wall panels with photographs of other buildings that Roth designed. In addition, the lobby contains a glass skylight measuring 40 ft (12 m) high, which once illuminated the palm room before being covered by a black dropped ceiling. As of 2023, the ground story contains a 1,650-square-foot (153 m^{2}) restaurant and an adjacent 800-to-1,000-square-foot (74 to 93 m^{2}) cocktail lounge.

==== Rooms ====
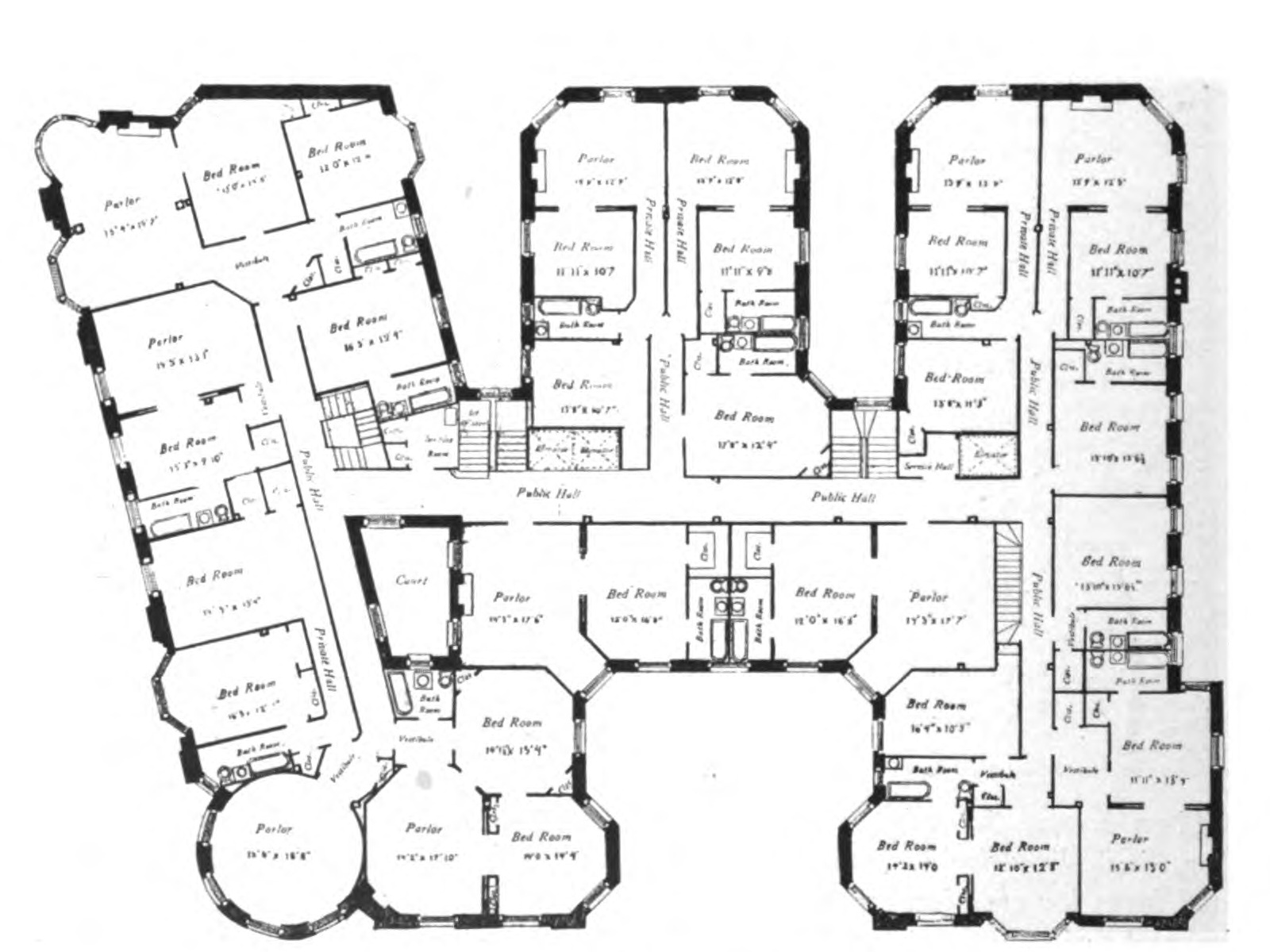
Floor plan of a typical floor in the hotel

There were originally 17 apartments on each floor, each with one to three rooms. Some units were rented to transient guests and were furnished, while others were intended for long-term residents. The smallest units were studio apartments with a bathroom attached to a bedroom. Larger suites had up to two bedrooms, a bathroom, and a parlor. Some of the suites had unconventionally-shaped spaces such as circular parlors and octagonal bedrooms, a result of the hotel's irregular plan. Lord & Taylor manufactured the hotel's original furniture. All of the parlors were clad in mahogany and contained a custom writing desk, while the bedrooms were finished in maple. Generally, the floors were made of hardwood, except in the bathrooms, which had mosaic tiles and porcelain tubs. The rooms also had large dressers and closets, which were intended to attract women guests. The Belleclaire was an apartment hotel, so none of the rooms had a kitchen or pantry; instead, residents were supposed to eat in the ground-level restaurant. Kitchenettes were added in the 1940s.

By the late 2000s, the Belleclaire had 30 economy rooms, with one bathroom for every three economy rooms; they were generally decorated in green and beige. Most of the hotel's units were en-suite rooms, which were larger. The hotel had 240 guestrooms by the 2010s, which are generally painted in a red, white, and brown color scheme. The rooms retain some of their original design features, including crown moldings and wooden floors. The hotel has suites named after former guests Mark Twain and Babe Ruth. As of 2025, the Belleclaire has 262 rooms.

== History ==
During the early 19th century, apartment developments in the city were generally associated with the working class. By the late 19th century, apartment hotels were becoming desirable among the middle and upper classes. Between 1880 and 1885, more than ninety apartment buildings were developed in the city. The city's first subway line was developed under the adjacent section of Broadway starting in the late 1890s, and it opened in 1904 with a station at Broadway and 79th Street. The construction of the subway spurred the development of high-rise apartment buildings on Broadway.

=== Development and early years ===
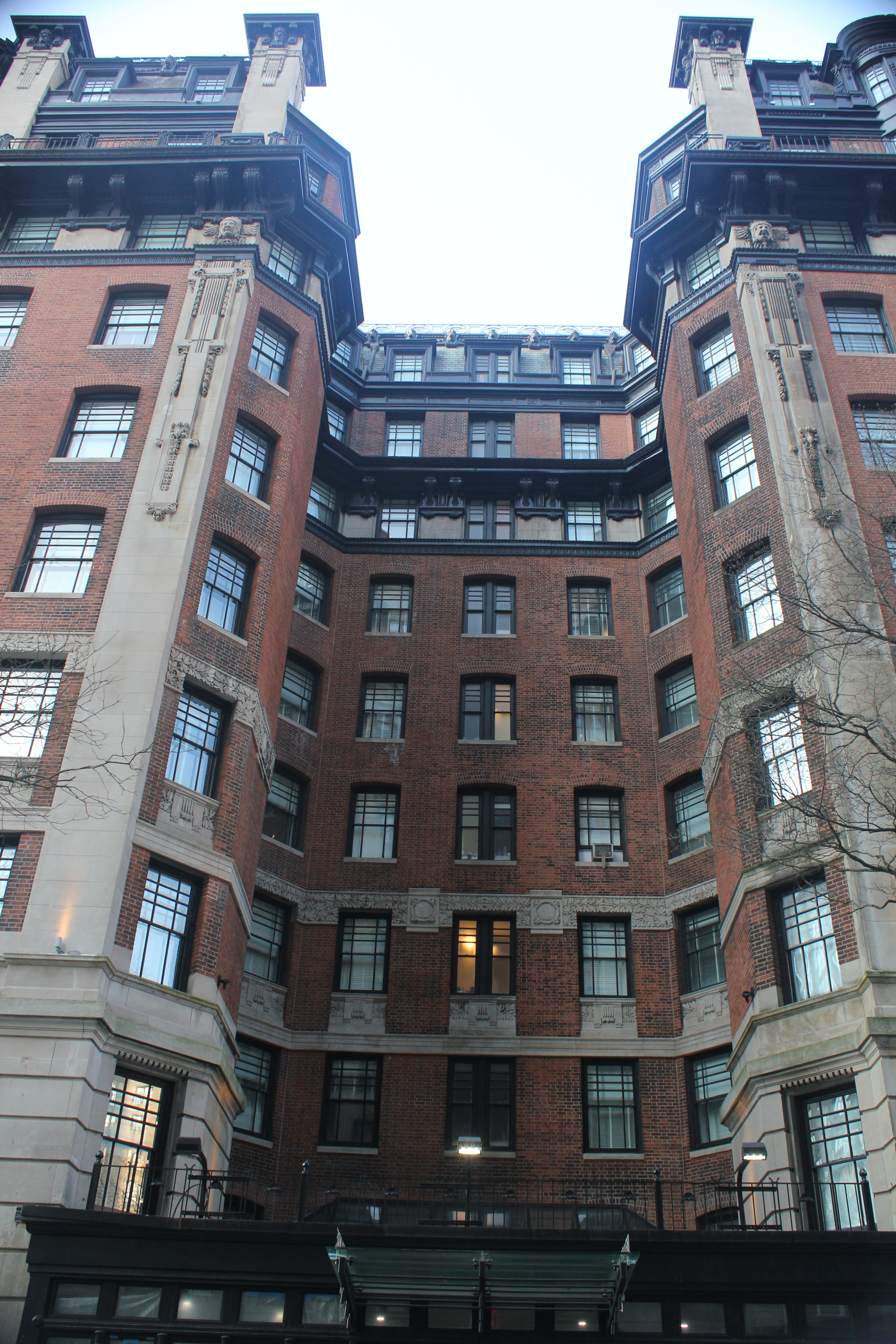
Courtyard on 77th Street

The hotel was developed by Albert Saxe, who acquired a site at the southwest corner of 77th Street and Broadway in September 1901. Saxe hired Roth to design an apartment hotel at 77th Street and Broadway. Saxe had been impressed with Roth's design of the Saxony apartment building at 250 West 82nd Street, which had been completed in 1899. The Belleclaire was Roth's first large commission; he hoped that the structure would compete with other large apartment hotels in the neighborhood such as the Ansonia, the Dorilton, and the Dakota. By November 1901, Roth had filed plans with the Manhattan Bureau of Buildings for a 10-story apartment hotel on the site. Saxe received a $500,000 mortgage loan from the Washington Life Insurance Company in 1902 to finance the hotel's construction. Contractors involved in the hotel's construction included metal supplier Leonard Sheet Metal Works and mosaic contractor Salagona & Co.

The Belleclaire formally opened on January 12, 1903. At the time of the hotel's opening, it was operated by Milton Roblee, who held a 21-year lease on the building. The Belleclaire's roof garden opened on June 6, 1903. Roblee initially charged between $2.50 and $6 per night (equivalent to between $90 and $215 in 2025); by that September, he had earned over $100,000 during just the preceding season. Among the hotel's early guests were writers Maxim Gorky and Mark Twain, as well as opera singer Bessie Abott. Hotel management ordered Gorky out of the hotel in 1906 after they learned he was staying there with a woman who was not his wife. Another guest used a piano crate to smuggle a pet lion into his room; the lion was evicted because it did not fall "under the category of regular guests". The hotel's bar was frequented by theatrical personalities such as McKee Rankin, John Barrymore, and Lionel Barrymore, as well as philanthropist Sir Thomas Lipton.

During the hotel's first few years, Roblee retained Roth to make alterations to the hotel. For instance, an entrance was installed on 77th Street, a basement bowling alley was removed to make way for storerooms, and the kitchens were rearranged. Roblee filed for bankruptcy in October 1906, at which point he owed $286,000 on the Belleclaire and another hotel. Saxe leased the building to Frank A. Archambault in August 1908 for 21 years at $65,000 a year. In addition to the $1.5 million that Archambault paid for the lease, he acquired the furniture for $100,000. Saxe received a $625,000 mortgage loan on the hotel later that year, replacing the hotel's previous mortgage.

=== 1910s to 1930s ===
The hotel's lease was sold in November 1910 to California hotelier Elmer F. Woodbury for $150,000, with 19 years remaining on the lease. The next month, the New York Supreme Court appointed a receiver for the hotel after Woodbury was unable to make payments on the mortgage. Woodbury finalized his acquisition of the hotel in February 1911 but filed for bankruptcy that September, at which time he owed $60,061 on the Belleclaire. Herbert Du Puy, a businessman from Pittsburgh, bought the hotel from Saxe in 1914 in a transaction valued at $2.25 million. As part of the deal, Du Puy sold Saxe the Hotel Antler in Pittsburgh.

Walter Guzzardi leased the hotel around 1920. After Guzzardi leased an adjacent site on 77th Street in 1922, he announced plans for a 10-story annex with 100 rooms and a roof garden, but this was never built. The hotel's bar was closed after alcoholic beverages were outlawed during Prohibition, even though numerous people wanted Guzzardi to convert the bar into a soft-drink cafe. Du Puy sold the Hotel Belleclaire, along with the nearby Lansing Building, in January 1923 to Samuel Brewer for $3 million. The Title Guaranty and Trust Company placed a $650,000 mortgage loan on the hotel the next month. Guzzardi renewed his lease in April 1925, intending to renovate the hotel extensively by adding storefronts and redesigning the roof garden. At this time, the hotel's roof garden was known as the Belleclaire Towers. The architect Louis Abramson designed a renovation of the ground level, which involved converting the dining room on Broadway into storefronts and relocating the main entrance to 77th Street. The storefronts were to cost $100,000; their first tenants included a gown shop and a milliner.

Frank W. Brindle of the Belleclaire Hotel Corporation leased the hotel in January 1928; at the time, it was recorded as containing eight storefronts and 350 rooms. The following month, Carrie Archambault, widow of former owner Frank A. Archambault, sued her husband's secretary Robert D. Blackman to regain control of the hotel's lease. Archambault alleged that Blackman had falsely told her the hotel was insolvent in 1914 and that the hotel had earned $400,000 since then. The Low-Ben Corporation leased the hotel, excluding the stores, for 21 years starting in 1931; by then, the hotel's rooms were being refurbished. The Mutual Life Insurance Company of New York foreclosed on the hotel in 1932 and bought the building for $50,000 at an auction that November. Many of the Belleclaire's long-term occupants moved away during the Great Depression, and The New York Times wrote that the Belleclaire had "lost any claim to distinction" by the 1930s. During the 1939 New York World's Fair, the hotel advertised itself as a short-term hotel, renting rooms for $2.50 per night.

=== 1940s to 1990s ===
The Belleclaire was sold in June 1940 to Samuel L. Lebis, at which point the building was valued at $915,000. Lebis hired Charles N. and Selig Whinston to design a $25,000 renovation of the hotel, which included adding kitchenettes and splitting up some three-room apartments into single-room units. The kitchenettes were added in 1943, and many hotel services such as housekeeping were discontinued. The hotel was resold in October 1944 to Joseph Miller of the N. E. M. Holding Corporation at an assessed value of $750,000. The Office of Price Administration, an agency of the U.S. government, accused the Belleclaire's operator of overcharging rent the same year. Louis Friedman and Philip Minkowitz acquired a 19-year lease on the Belleclaire in 1953 from the Belleclaire Management Corporation. During that decade, the dome atop the hotel's rounded corner was removed.

Over the years, the building started to physically deteriorate due to a lack of maintenance. Wealthier guests chose to stay elsewhere, and the Belleclaire became known as a youth hostel and a shelter for those displaced by disasters. By the early 1970s, the Belleclaire was one of several single room occupancy hotels along Broadway on the Upper West Side. By the 1980s, the hotel was generally characterized as safe, although there were scattered violent incidents such as a mass shooting in 1983 that killed the hotel's manager and three guests. During that decade, most tenants were full-time residents who generally occupied multi-room apartments, although the Belleclaire also accepted transient guests.

The New York City Landmarks Preservation Commission (LPC) designated the Belleclaire as an official landmark on February 10, 1987, even though none of the original ground floor remained intact. The administration of New York City mayor David Dinkins announced in November 1992 that it would relocate up to 80 families into the Belleclaire and the nearby Cambridge House Hotel, both of which were managed by Morris Horn, after a judge ordered officials to find temporary housing for homeless families. The city would have paid the Belleclaire's owners $250,000 a month to house 100 homeless families at the hotel. At the time, the Belleclaire's occupants were largely rent-stabilized residents paying $600 to $800 per month. The proposal received significant opposition from people who lived near both hotels, and Horn requested that the families be relocated elsewhere. Ultimately, the Belleclaire was not used as a homeless shelter.

After a piece of masonry fell off the facade during a storm in December 1997, the New York City Council passed a law mandating more frequent building inspections citywide. By then, the facade was deteriorating significantly; building experts cited deferred maintenance as a factor in the incident. During the late 1990s, a group named Banana Bungalow rented some of the rooms and operated them as a hostel.

=== Horn operation ===
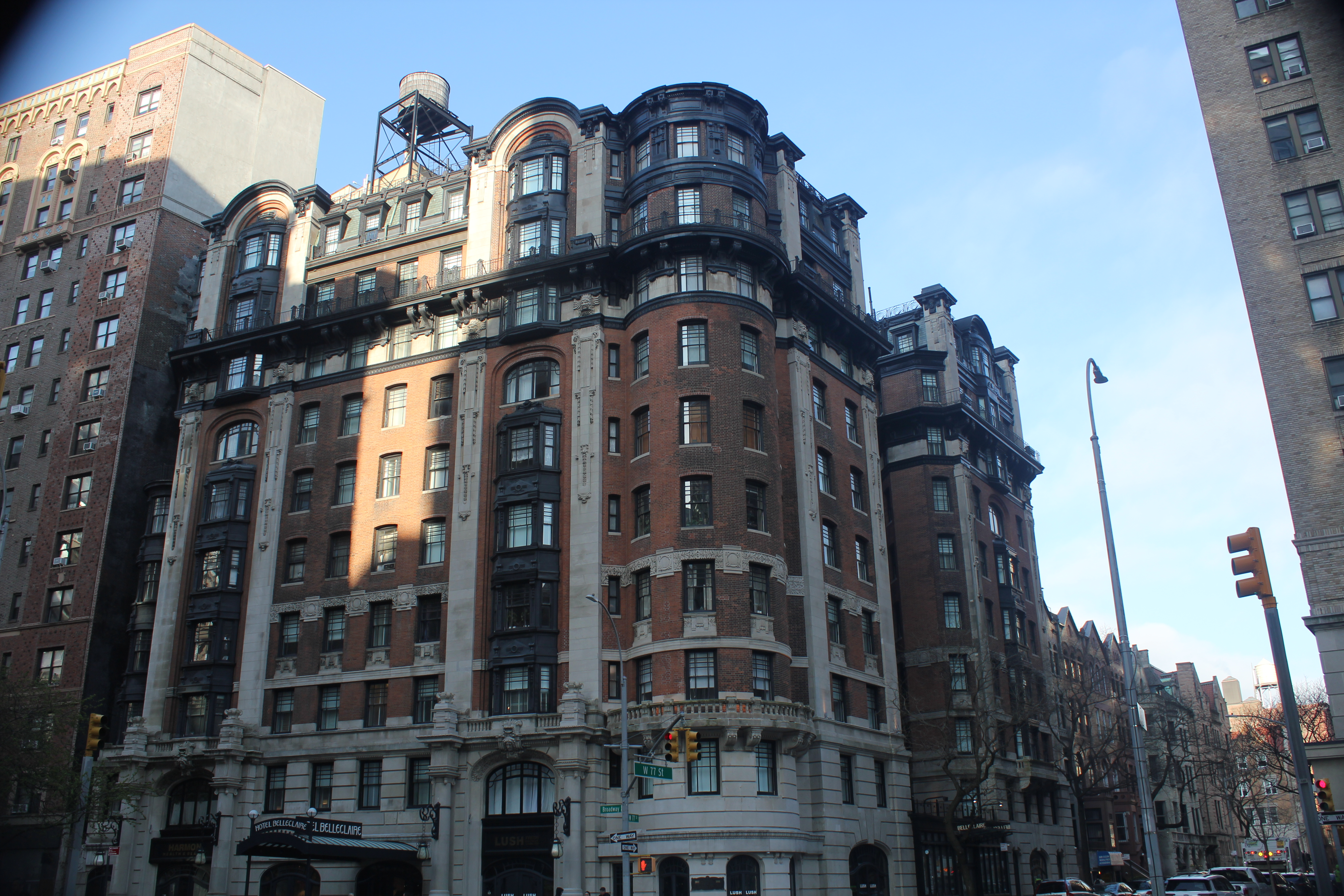
The hotel as seen from diagonally across Broadway and 77th Street

Amid an increase in tourism in New York City, Shimmie Horn began operating the hotel in 1999 and renovated it, adding amenities to attract guests. With the LPC's permission, the owner restored the deteriorating facade, and Horn also redecorated the guestrooms in a "neo-Scandinavian" style. Many of the hotel's existing single-room occupancy tenants left, and some of the remaining tenants complained of unreliable water and electricity. The city government issued a summons to the hotel's owners in June 2000, saying that the owners had not received a permit for the renovation, although Horn denied allegations that his company was harassing tenants. The renovation had been completed by 2003. Because a significant number of long-term residents still lived at the Belleclaire, only 185 guestrooms were available for short-term guests. Despite the proximity of attractions such as Central Park, the rooms only cost $119 to $129 per night, less than the citywide average of $170.

Horn extended the hotel's lease by 40 years in 2011, paying $33 million. Horn subsequently raised the rent for the ground-level storefronts, prompting a longtime tenant, burger shop Big Nick's, to move out. Horn announced plans in 2013 to restore the ground-level storefronts, and a pastry shop took over Big Nick's space. The Belleclaire became part of Triumph Hotels, a brand of boutique hotels operated by Horn, in 2014. The facade was partially renovated in 2018; at the time, a writer for the Times said that 15 long-term tenants remained.

During the COVID-19 pandemic in New York City, in 2020, the city government relocated numerous homeless men into the Belleclaire as part of a contract between the city government and the Hotel Association of New York City (HANYC). The move created a clash between the homeless population and the residents of the Upper West Side neighborhood. Some nearby residents objected to the fact that several of the homeless men who had been relocated to the hotel were sex offenders, and several elderly residents of the hotel claimed that the presence of the homeless residents would endanger their health. Many of the homeless residents were moved out of the hotel in August 2021. A restaurant and cocktail bar named Allure opened on the hotel's ground floor in November 2023.

== Critical reception ==
When the Belleclaire opened, the New-York Tribune described the hotel as "luxuriously furnished with striking and original decorative effects in several of the public rooms", while the Sun said the Belleclaire "stands in the front rank of twentieth-century hotel development". The Atlanta Constitution wrote in 1904: "Yet, with all of its admirable features, elegant furnishings, superb accommodations, fine menu, perfect service, conveniences and most desirable location, the rates charged at this hotel are within the easy reach of any traveler." By the 1960s, Newsweek regarded the hotel's design as "ornamental rococo frippery", while Roth's sons, who carried on their father's practice, considered the design to be full of "junk and gunk". Paul Goldberger, writing for The New York Times in 1978, called the hotel "richly ornamented, with a round corner tower and grand ornamental arches". After the storefronts were refurbished in the early 2010s, Christopher Gray wrote: "The series of standard green awnings are certainly an improvement but hardly equal to the architecture above them."

John Holusha of the Times wrote in 2003 that Roth's design was "so distinctive and flamboyant that it would later be designated a landmark." After the hotel's renovation, a writer for The Washington Post said in 2007 that the Belleclaire "is super chic, with modern dark-wood furniture and stylish bedding".

== See also ==
- List of hotels in New York City
- List of New York City Designated Landmarks in Manhattan from 59th to 110th Streets
- List of buildings and structures on Broadway in Manhattan
