= The Iroquois New York =

Hotel in Manhattan, New York

Coordinates: 40°45′21″N 73°58′55.3″W

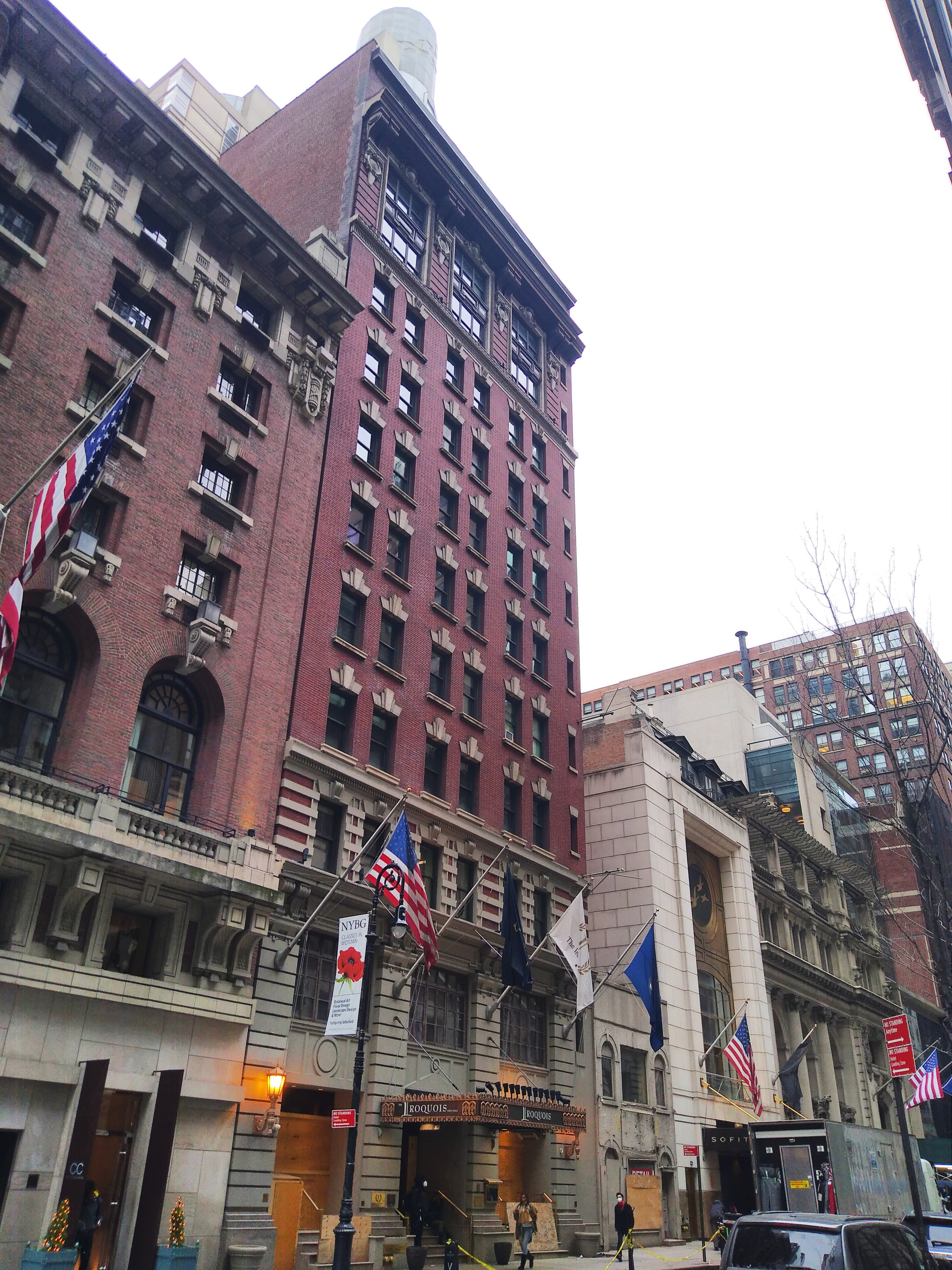

The Iroquois Hotel New York is located at 49 West 44th Street between Fifth Avenue and Sixth Avenue in the Midtown Manhattan neighborhood of New York City. It is one of six hotels owned by Shimmie Horn and Gerald Barad under the Triumph Hotels brand. The hotel is part of Small Luxury Hotels of the World, a European-based referral service that sets standards for furnishings and service.

== Site ==
The Iroquois Hotel is on 49 West 44th Street, on the north sidewalk between Sixth Avenue and Fifth Avenue, in the Midtown Manhattan neighborhood of New York City. The rectangular land lot covers 9,221 ft^{2} (856.7 m^{2}), with a frontage of 91.83 ft (27.99 m) on 44th Street and a depth of 100.42 ft (31 m). On the same block, the Algonquin Hotel is to the west, while the New York Yacht Club Building, the Sofitel New York Hotel, and the Harvard Club of New York City building are to the east. Other nearby buildings include the Belasco Theatre to the west; Americas Tower to the northwest; 1166 Avenue of the Americas to the north; the New York City Bar Association Building and the Royalton Hotel to the south; and the Penn Club of New York Building, General Society of Mechanics and Tradesmen, and Hotel Mansfield to the southeast.

The adjacent block of 44th Street is known as Club Row, which contains several clubhouses. When the hotel was developed in 1900, the area was filled with clubhouses, including those of the Harvard Club, Yale Club, New York Yacht Club, New York City Bar Association, and Century Association. Prior to the development of the Iroquois Hotel, the neighborhood contained a slaughterhouse, stables for stagecoach horses, and a train yard for the elevated Sixth Avenue Line. There were historically many stagecoach stables on 43rd and 44th Streets between Fifth and Sixth Avenues, but only a few of these stables remained at the end of the 20th century, including the Iroquois Hotel's stable. The Iroquois is also one of six hotels on 44th Street between Fifth and Sixth Avenues, the largest concentration of hotels on a single block in New York City during the early 21st century.

== Architecture ==
The hotel was designed by Harry Mulliken from the architectural firm Mulliken & Moeller. The hotel consists of the 12-story main building, as well as a two-story annex to the east. The annex was erected as a stable in 1865 by Benjamin Jones and Andrew Luke, who erected three additional stables between 43 and 49 West 44th Street.

By 1999, the Iroquois had 105 guestrooms and nine suites, each of which had European fabrics, marble bathrooms, three telephone lines, and individual thermostats and telephones. The lobby contains polished-stone walls and a central grandfather clock; it formerly had a chrome-and-glass barber shop, which was replaced in 1999 with a library. On the third floor, there is a health club facing 44th Street, which occupies a space the size of a suite. On each story is a maid's room, as well as a room for disabled guests. In addition, six of the hotel's 12 guestroom floors are designated as non-smoking floors.

== History ==
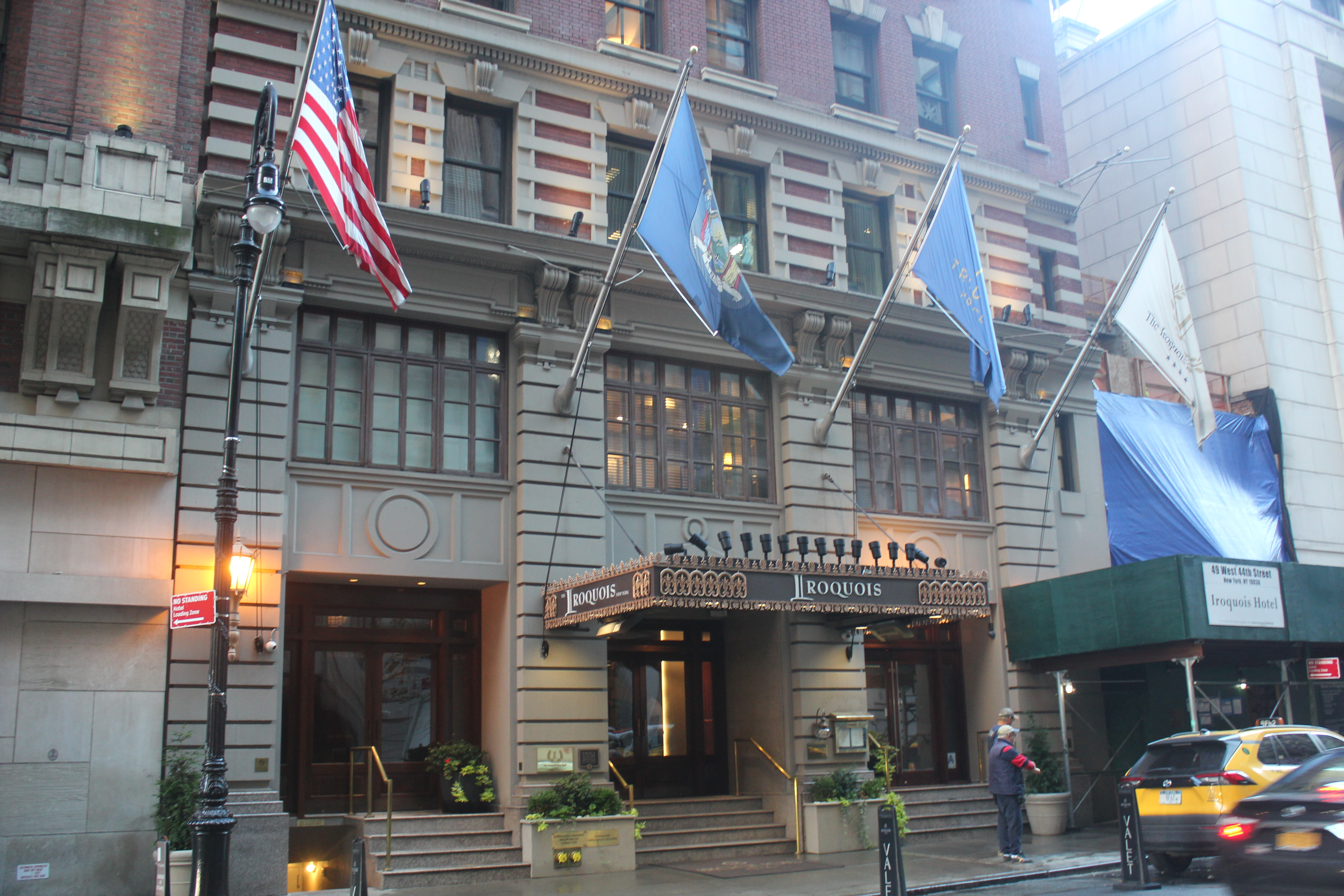
The entrance

The Seaboard Realty Company filed plans with the New York City Department of Buildings in June 1899, which called for the construction of a 12-story hotel at a cost of $150,000. In an article that September, the New York World indicated that the hotel would cost $250,000 to build and another $150,000 to furnish. At the time, construction had not started because of the high price of steel. Like the neighboring Algonquin Hotel, it was named after a Native American tribe that lived in New York (namely the Iroquois); however, the two hotels are not otherwise known to be related. The Iroquois was completed in 1900. That December, the Seaboard Realty Company agreed to sell the Iroquois to a client of A. W. McLaughlin & Co. for about $325,000. The McLaughlin firm's client acquired an adjacent two-story stable at 47 West 44th Street in October 1901, and the stable became part of the hotel.

When the Iroquois opened, it operated as an apartment hotel, rather than a short-term hotel. The Iroquois was near six clubhouses, as well as the upscale Delmonico's and Sherry's restaurants. The New York Daily News later described the hotel as "a bright star in the clubby constellation of W. 44th St". During the Great Depression the hotel was able to maintain its reputation as a "refined, well-kept hotel". The New York League of Business and Professional Women relocated to the hotel's annex in April 1934.

William H. Peterken of the Iroquois Hotel Corporation leased the Iroquois for ten years in 1940, at which point the hotel could accommodate 350 people per night. Peterken planned to spend $25,000 on renovations. The hotel was auctioned off in November 1942 to settle a $230,000 debt. The Office of Price Administration, an agency of the U.S. government, accused the Iroquois's operators of overcharging rent in 1944. Louis Schleifer's Gibraltar Security Corporation bought the Iroquois in 1947, but Schleifer resold it to David Rappoport of the Midland Investing Corporation four days later. At the time, the hotel had 153 rooms with 94 baths. William Seidenfeld and Nathan Feinberg of the Nibis Corporation leased the Iroquois in 1948, with the intention of converting the three-story annex to a showroom. The Iroquois Operating Corporation filed alteration plans in 1951, indicating that it would build a restaurant at the hotel for $5,000.

In 1987, Jan Wallman opened a cabaret and nightclub at 49 West 44th Street. In 1996 Horn took over the ownership of the hotel, which had been in his family's possession since 1959. Shimmie Horn spent $13 million to renovate the hotel so it could better compete with the Algonquin, Sofitel, and Royalton. Rather than close the hotel completely, Horn renovated two floors at a time. He demolished a second elevator shaft to make space for additional rooms, and he replaced a barber shop in the lobby with a library. In addition, the Judy's cabaret on the ground floor of the main building was combined with Alonzo's Restaurant in the adjacent stable. After the renovation, the Iroquois became part of a group called Small Luxury Hotels of the World. At the time, the hotel's room rates ranged from a minimum of $275 for a room to a maximum of $345 for a suite.

== Notable tenants ==
In 1949, the hotel was the headquarters of the National Council of the Arts, Sciences and Professionals. James Dean lived at the hotel for two years from 1951 to 1953 in room 83 (later known as room 803). The female lead in Peter Link's Broadway musical Earl of Ruston (1971), Leecy R. Woods Moore, also temporarily lived at the hotel in 1971.

== Critical reception ==
A writer for the Pittsburgh Post-Gazette wrote that the James Dean Suite was a "sybaritic indulgence that James Dean could never have experienced back in those years before the hotel was restored to its recent present-day status as one of the world's finest small luxury hotels".

== Sources ==
- Algonquin Hotel (PDF) (Report). New York City Landmarks Preservation Commission. September 15, 1987.
