= Triumph Hotels =

Brand of boutique hotels in New York City

- Type: Hotel collection, business
- Industry: Hospitality
- Headquarters: New York City
- Number of locations: 6
- Area served: New York City
- Key people: Gerald Barad and Shimmie Horn (co-owners)
- Products: Hotels
- Website: www.triumphhotels.com/home/

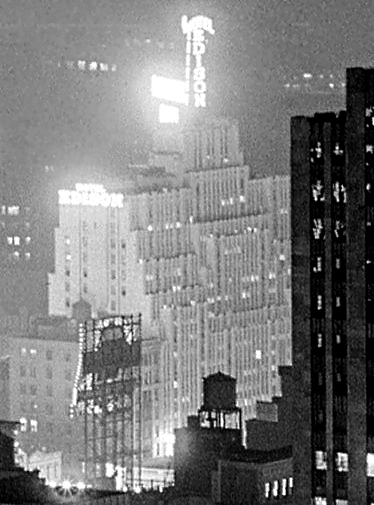
The Hotel Edison in New York City, as seen from 515 Madison Ave – December 5, 1933

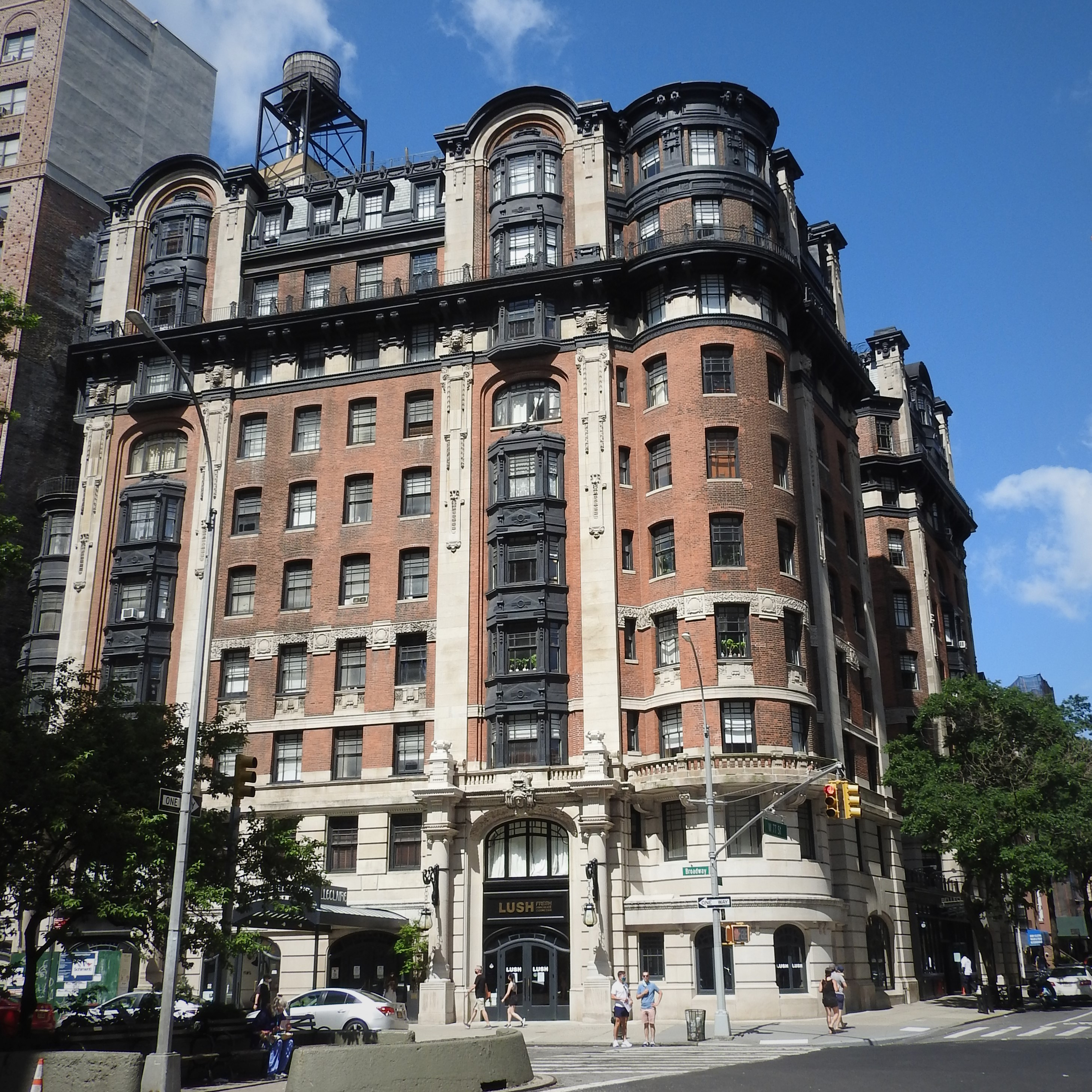
Belleclaire

Triumph Hotels is a collection of historic boutique hotels in New York City which includes the Hotel Belleclaire (a designated landmark in Manhattan), The Iroquois Hotel and the Hotel Edison. Famous past guests have included James Dean, Abraham Lincoln and Mark Twain. The hotel brand is co-owned by Gerald Barad and Shimmie Horn.

== History and famous guests ==
James Dean lived in the Iroquois (which now features The James Dean Suite), which also served as the headquarters of The National Council of the Arts, Sciences and Professionals in 1949. The seminal British punk band the Clash wrote the song Rock the Casbah while staying at the Iroquois.

Hotel Edison's namesake Thomas Edison turned on the lights at the hotel's grand opening and both the building and its restaurants have since been featured in several films, including The Godfather, Bullets Over Broadway and Birdman.

In November 2017 the Hotel Chandler was shut down and converted into a first homeless shelter for New York City families.

== Hotels ==
- The Iroquois New York (opened in 1900)
- The Frederick Hotel (originally known as The Cosmopolitan Hotel – Tribeca; built in the 19th Century)
- The Evelyn (built in 1903)
- The Hotel Belleclaire (built in 1903)
- The Washington Jefferson (originated before World War II as two hotels)
- The Hotel Edison (built in 1931)
