= Salomon Jansz van den Tempel =

Salomon Jansz van den Tempel (16 April 1633, in Rotterdam – 10 November 1673, in Rotterdam) was a 17th-century master shipbuilder. The ships he built included the Dutch ship of the line De Zeven Provinciën (The Seven Provinces), which was built in 1664-65 for the Admiralty of de Maze based in Rotterdam (one of the five autonomous Dutch admiralties).
