= USS Triumph =

USS Triumph may refer to the following ships of the United States Navy:

- USS Triumph (AM-323), was an Auk-class minesweeper launched in 1943 and transferred to Norway in 1961
- USNS Triumph (T-AGOS-4), is a Stalwart-class ocean surveillance ship launched in 1985; laid up in 1995 and awaiting disposal
