= French ship Triomphant (1667) =

Ship of the line of the French Navy

History

France
- Name: Triomphant
- Builder: Jean-Pierre Brun, Soubise
- Laid down: December 1665
- Launched: May 1667
- Out of service: 1690
- Renamed: Launched as Princesse in 1667, renamed Triomphant on 24 June 1671, then Constant on 28 June 1678
- Fate: Hulked

General characteristics
- Length: 137 French feet (Note: The French (pre-metric) foot was 6.575% longer than the equivalent English foot.)
- Beam: 34½ French feet
- Draught: 16 French feet
- Depth of hold: 16 French feet
- Complement: 400, + 5/9 officers
- Armament: 60, later 64 guns: 10 × 24-pounders and 14 × 18-pounders on the lower deck; 24 × 12-pounders on the middle deck; 16 × 6-pounders on the upper deck (4 forwards and 12 aft of the unarmed waist section)

Triomphant was a ship of the line of the French Navy. She was a three-decker, although the upper deck was only partially armed, with an unarmed sections between the guns towards the bow and those towards the stern. She was built from 1665 to 1667 as Princesse, and under this name she took part in the Expedition to Candia in 1669, but she was renamed Triomphant on 24 June 1671 and subsequently Constant on 28 June 1678. She was converted into a hulk in 1690 and renamed Vieux Constant, surviving in this role until 1704.
