= USNS Triumph =

US Navy surveillance ship (1984–1995)

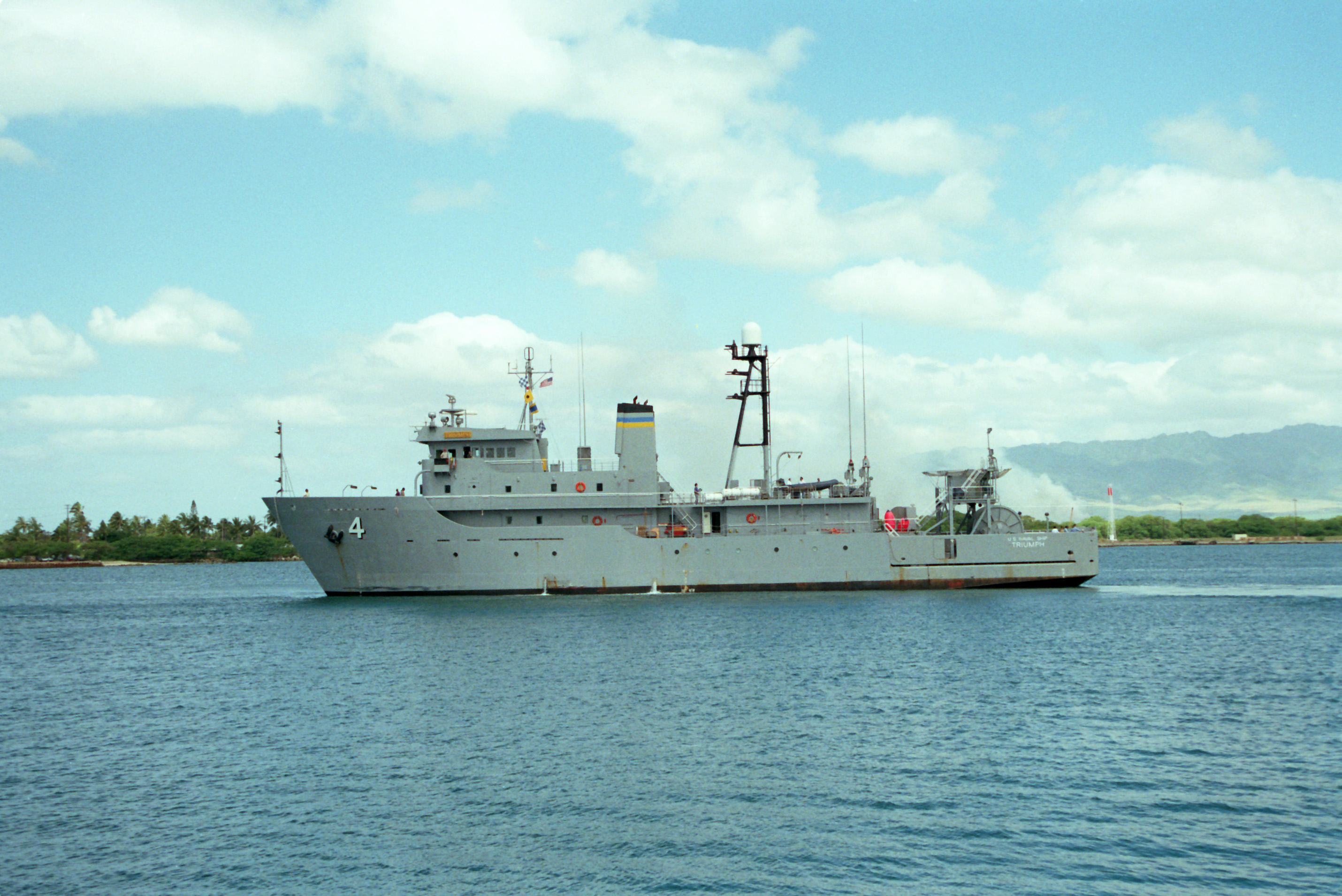
- Triumph departing Pearl Harbor, 1991.

History

United States
- Name: USNS Triumph (T-AGOS-4)
- Operator: Military Sealift Command
- Ordered: February 13, 1981
- Builder: Tacoma Boatbuilding Company
- Laid down: January 3, 1984
- Launched: September 17, 1984
- Acquired: February 19, 1985
- Stricken: January 6, 1995
- Identification: IMO number: 8835592
- Fate: Disposed of by Navy title transfer to the Maritime Administration

General characteristics
- Displacement: 2,250 tons
- Length: 224 ft (68 m)
- Beam: 43 ft (13 m)
- Draft: 16.0 ft (4.9 m)
- Speed: 11 kn (20 km/h; 13 mph)
- Crew: 36

USNS Triumph (T-AGOS-4) is a Stalwart-class ocean surveillance ship formerly of the United States Navy. She was struck from the Naval Vessel Register in 1995. On 1 October 2012 the ship was disposed of by Navy title transfer to the Maritime Administration. As of May 2015, Triumph was held as a reserve asset for spare parts for sister ships General Rudder and State of Michigan.

Stalwart class ships were originally designed to collect underwater acoustical data in support of Cold War anti-submarine warfare operations in the 1980s.

In 1998, the US Congress authorized the sale of Triumph, without the towed sonar array, to the Philippines for $11,370,000. However, the sale was not completed.

== Design ==
The Stalwart-class ocean surveillance ships were succeeded by the longer Victorious-class ocean surveillance ships. Triumph had an overall length of 224 feet (68 m) and a length of 203 feet 6 inches (62.03 m) at its waterline. It had a beam of 43 feet (13 m) and a draft of 15 feet (4.6 m). The surveillance ship had a displacement of 1,600 tonnes (1,600 long tons; 1,800 short tons) at light load and 2,301 tonnes (2,265 long tons; 2,536 short tons) at full load. It was powered by a diesel-electric system of four Caterpillar D-398 diesel-powered generators and two General Electric 550 metric horsepower (540 shp; 400 kW) electric motors. This produced a total of 3,200 metric horsepower (3,200 shp; 2,400 kW) that drove two shafts. It had a gross register tonnage of 1,584 and a deadweight tonnage of 786.

The Stalwart-class ocean surveillance ships had maximum speeds of 11 knots (20 km/h; 13 mph). They were built to be fitted with the Surveillance Towed Array Sensor System (SURTASS) system. The ship had an endurance of thirty days. It had a range of 3,000 miles (2,600 nmi; 4,800 km) and a speed of 11 knots (20 km/h; 13 mph). Its complement was between thirty-two and forty-seven. Its hull design was similar to that of the Powhatan-class tugboats.
