= Rue de Nesle =

Street in Paris, France

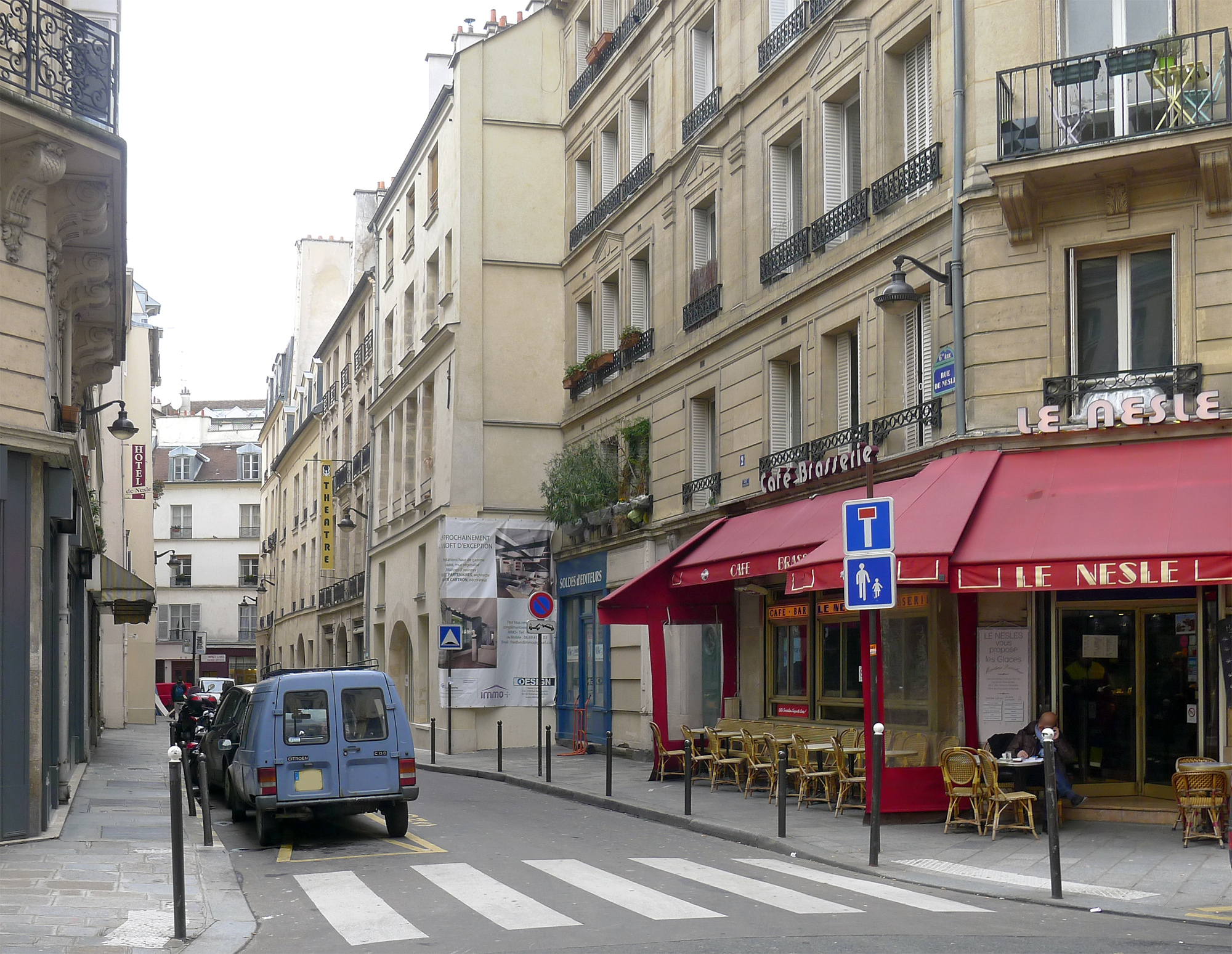
- The intersection of the Rue Dauphine with the Rue de Nesle

- Location within Paris
- Length: 71 m (233 ft)
- Width: 10 m (33 ft)
- Arrondissement: 6th
- Quarter: Monnaie
- Coordinates: 48°51′19″N 2°20′21″E
- From: 24 Rue Dauphine
- To: 17 Rue de Nevers

Construction
- Completion: 1607
- Denomination: February 26, 1867

The Rue de Nesle is a street in Saint-Germain-des-Prés in the 6th arrondissement of Paris, France.

== History ==
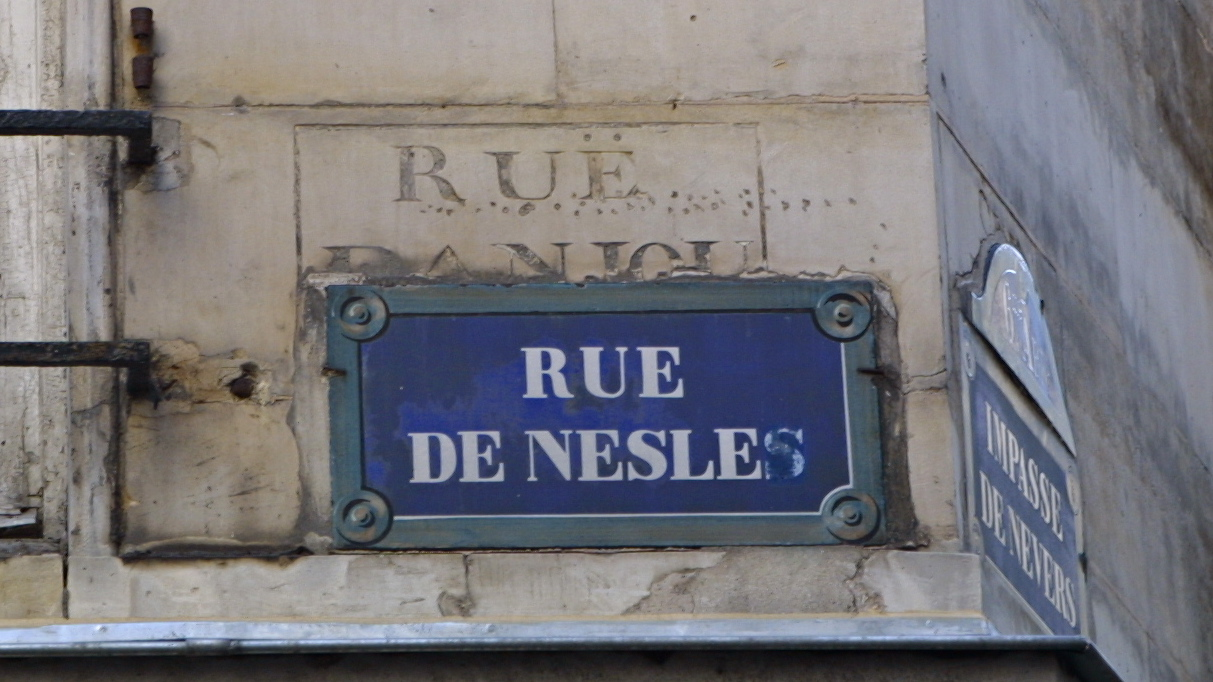
Corner of the Rue de Nesle with the Impasse de Nevers

The street was opened in 1607. It was formerly called the Rue d'Anjou Dauphine. Its current name comes from the fact that the street is located at the former location of the Hôtel de Nesle.

According to historians, an underground passage going to the Tour de Nesle existed at the no. 13 of the street and was used by Marguerite de Bourgogne to reach the Tour de Nesle.

== Access ==
Located near the Metro station: Odéon.

== Features ==
It is home to the Museum of Letters and Manuscripts and it crosses with the Rue Dauphine. It is in short distance from the Seine and the Louvre Museum.

== See also ==
- The Doge on the Bucintoro near the Riva di Sant'Elena
