= The Doge on the Bucintoro near the Riva di Sant'Elena =

c. 1775–80 painting by Francesco Guardi

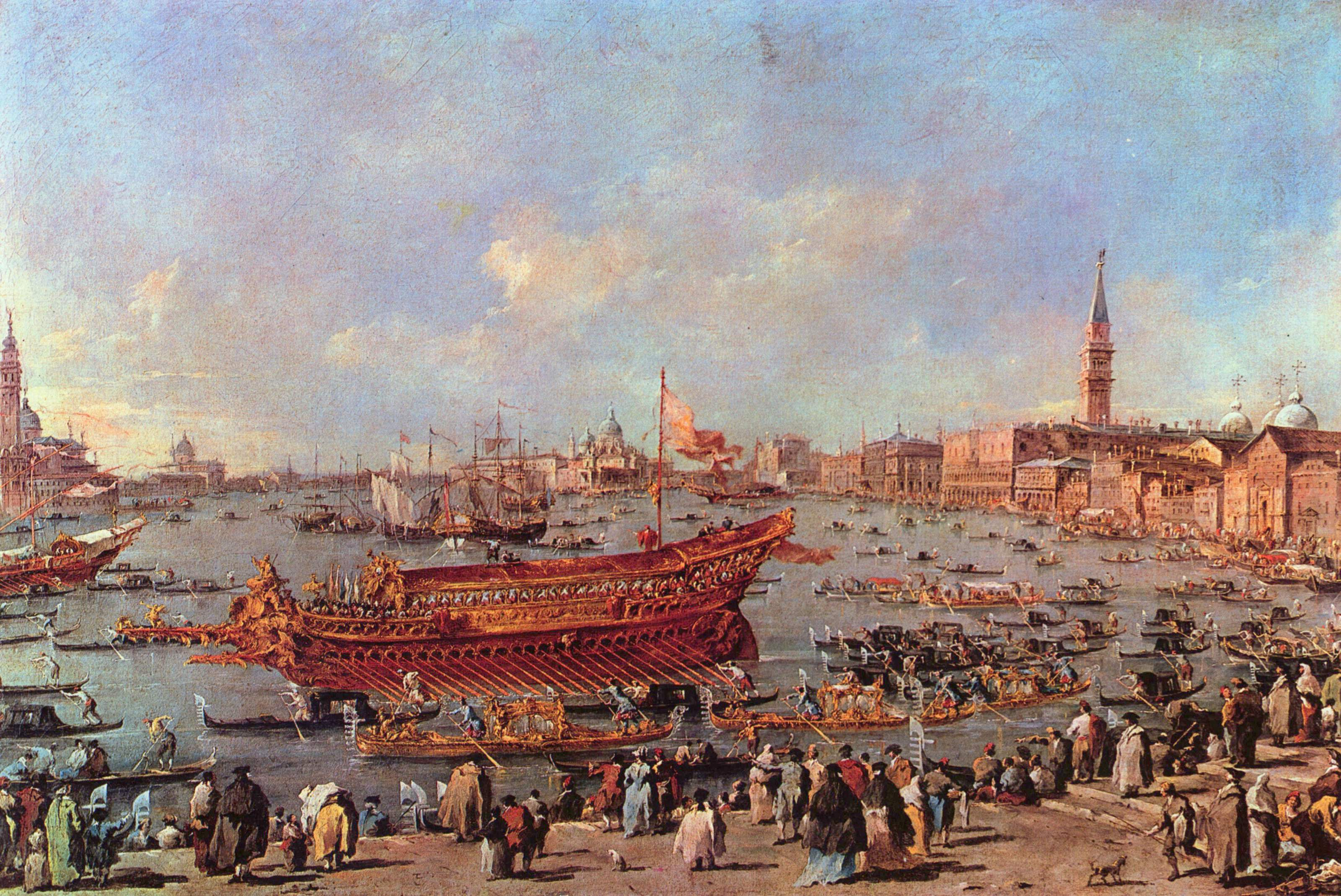
- Artist: Francesco Guardi
- Year: c. 1775–1780
- Medium: Oil on canvas
- Dimensions: 66 cm × 100 cm (26 in × 39 in)
- Location: Louvre, Paris

The Doge on the Bucintoro near the Riva di Sant'Elena (also known as The Departure of the Bucentaur for the Ascension Day Ceremony, and other similar titles) is an oil painting on canvas by the Venetian painter Francesco Guardi. It was painted between 1775 and 1780, and is now in the Louvre in Paris.

This work is one of a series of twelve paintings representing the Solennità dogali (The Doge's Solemnities), in which the artist has faithfully copied the scenes drawn by Canaletto and engraved by Giambattista Brustolon to commemorate the festivities at the coronation of the Doge Alvise Giovanni Mocenigo in 1763. This has led to some confusion, and the canvases were formerly attributed to Canaletto, though their style was quite unmistakably that of Guardi.

== Subject ==
This painting and another in the series represent the Festa della Sensa, the most sumptuous of all Venetian festivals. It took place each year on Ascension Day, the anniversary of the setting out of Doge Pietro II Orseolo's expedition which achieved the conquest of Dalmatia in c. 1000. It was also a celebration of the Treaty of Venice of 1177 between the Doge Sebastiano Ziani, Pope Alexander III and the Holy Roman Emperor, Frederick Barbarossa. In a magnificent state barge known as the Bucentaur (in Italian, Bucintoro), the Doge visited the Lido and celebrated the Marriage of the Sea ceremony of Venice with the Adriatic Sea, by casting a ring into the waters.

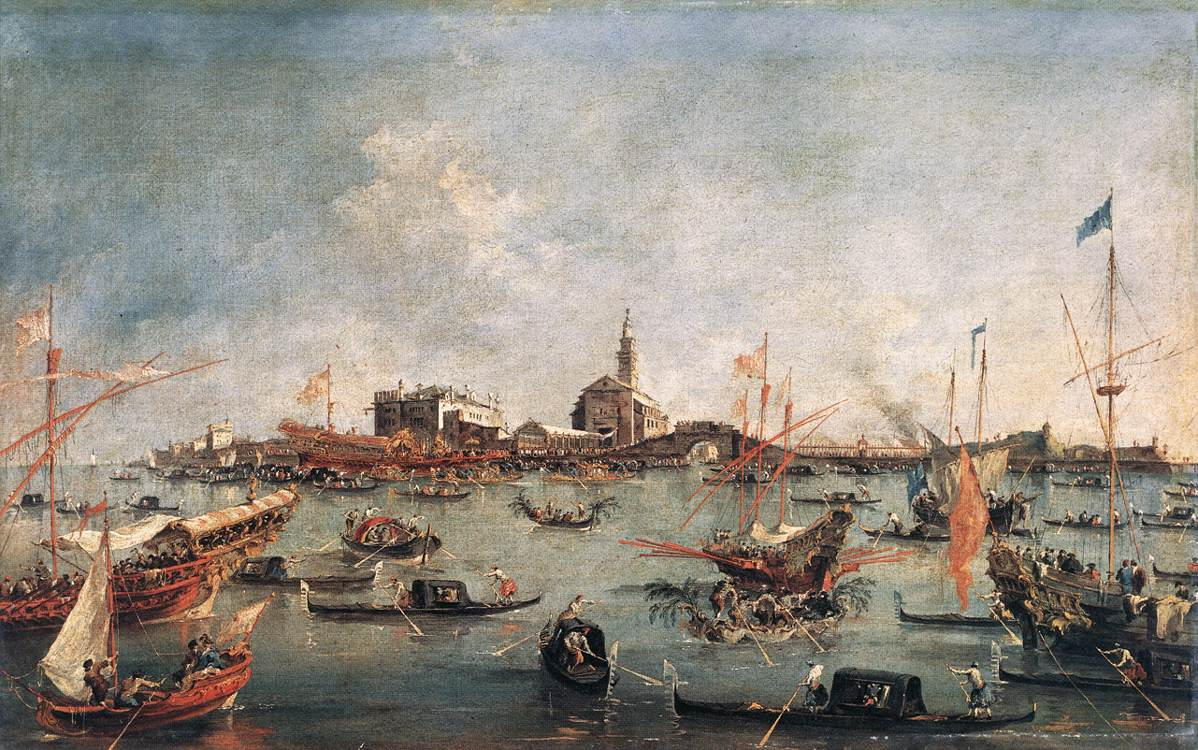
The Doge on the Bucentaur at San Niccolò del Lido by Francesco Guardi (c. 1775–1780)

This particular canvas shows the Bucentaur leaving Venice. Another in the series represents the Doge going to hear Mass at San Nicolò al Lido.

== History ==
This painting entered the Louvre as a result of a confiscation in 1797 of the Count Joseph François Xavier de Pestre de Seneffe collection. It was selected by the Louvre, with eleven other paintings in the same series, at the Hôtel de Nesle; it was then sent to the Muséum de Toulouse (now a museum of natural history), which handed it back to the Louvre in 1952 in exchange for a portrait by Ingres and another painting by Guardi.

Under the First French Empire, the series was broken up: seven remained in the Louvre, one was sent to Brussels, two to Nantes, one to Toulouse and one to Grenoble. The return in 1952 of the Toulouse painting to the Louvre, through the aforementioned exchange, has been the first step in an attempt to reassemble the set and display them in a special room. Today ten paintings of the series are exhibited in the Louvre.
