= Pleasure barge =

Flat-bottomed, slow-moving boat used for leisure

A pleasure barge is a flat-bottomed, slow-moving boat used for leisure. It is contrasted with a standard barge, which is used to transport freight. Many places where canals or rivers play a prominent role have developed pleasure barges for conducting religious ceremonies, holding waterborne festivities, or viewing scenery.

== History ==
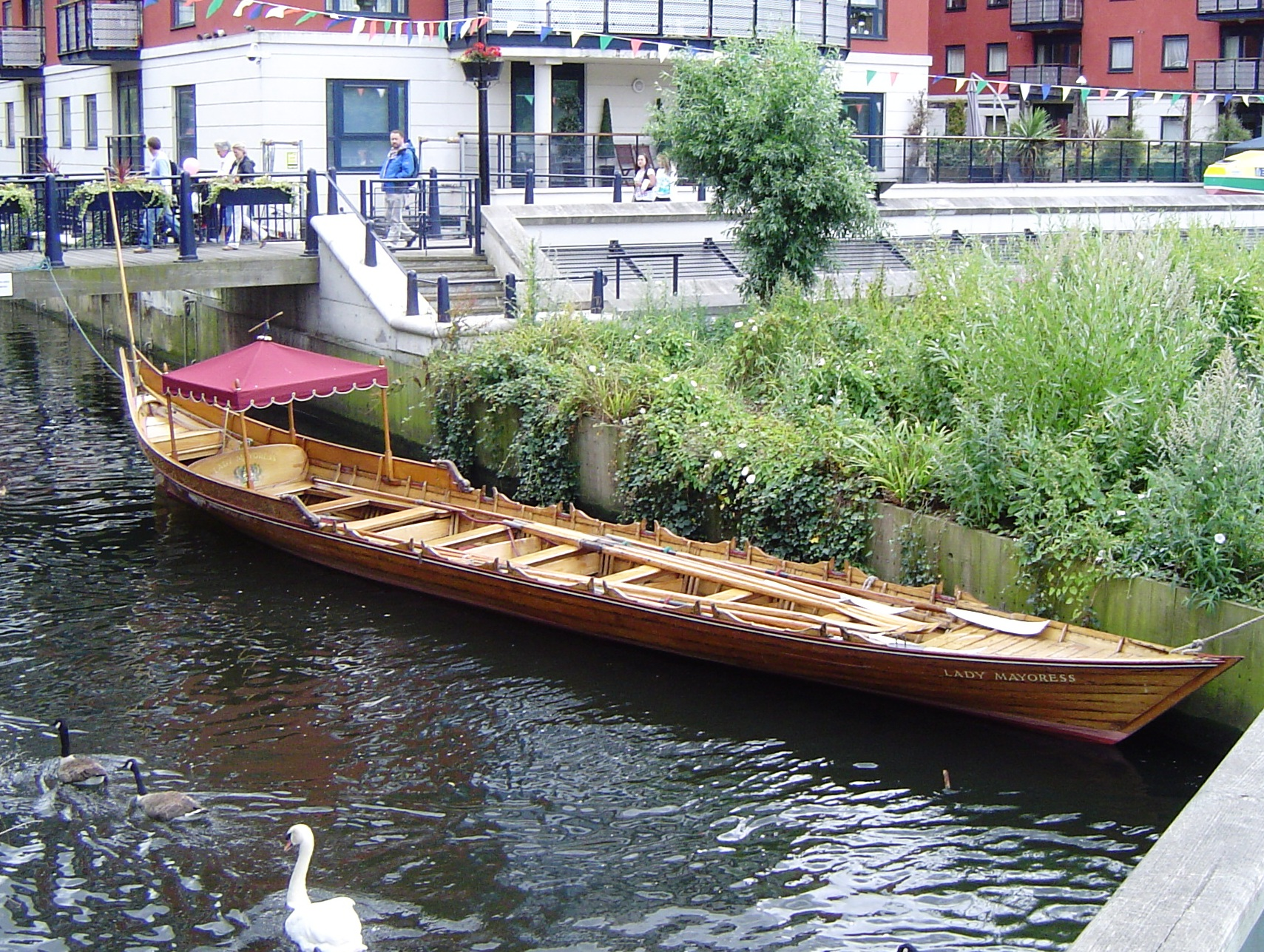
Shallop for ceremonial use on the River Thames at Kingston upon Thames

Barges of all kinds were commonly used on the Nile in ancient Egypt. When the Pharaoh Akhenaten revolutionized Egyptian religion, he renamed his pleasure barge "Splendor of Aten", after his dominant god. A miniature of a royal barge was found amongst the items in the tomb of Tutankhamun. The most famous Egyptian barge, the Thalamegos, is that used by Cleopatra VII of Ptolemaic Egypt when she arrived in luxurious state to seduce Mark Antony and also allegedly when she sailed up the Nile with Julius Caesar.

11th-century Chinese writer Ouyang Xiu mentions a pleasure barge in his poetry with oars the color of orchids (or magnolias, depending on the translation). An ivory model of a Qing Dynasty imperial pleasure barge exists at the Vancouver Maritime Museum. In 1357, King Boromtrailokanat of Ayudhaya, in what would later become Thailand, decreed a yearly barge race. His barge would compete against the barge of his consort. If the consort's barge won, then the year would bring abundance. If the King's barge won then it would signify hardship. The consort's barge was usually allowed to win. A later Thai king included a royal barge bearing Buddhist relics in his war party against Burma. By the 17th century, royal Thai barge processions included more than 100 barges, and oarsmen wore matching red garments and gold jewelry.

Wealthy states which relied on water trade sometimes developed barges specifically linked to the ruling class. A painting by Jan van de Cappelle from 1650 depicts the state barge of the Netherlands being saluted by gun blasts from battle ships.

The doges of Venice also traveled by a state barge, the Bucentaur, especially to perform the yearly held Marriage of the Sea.

The Grand Canal de Versailles at Versailles served as a setting for elaborate play barges in the 17th and 18th centuries. The gilded goddess figurehead from Marie Antoinette's barge survives, and Napoleon commissioned a ceremonial barge for his official visit to the port of Brest in 1810. The latter is at the French Musée national de la Marine.

Until the middle of the 19th century, pleasure barges were common sights on the River Thames in London and beyond. These included shallops, luxury transport for the upper class, rowed by up to eight liveried servants, and sometimes decorated with gilded carvings and ornate draperies. Handel's famous Water Music was composed to be played with its audiences listening from pleasure barges. The City livery companies competed as to the luxury of their state barges.

Up the river at Oxford, where a stretch of the Thames is known as the Isis, many college Boat Clubs permanently moored large two-decker barges in their college colors to use as clubhouses. These proved too expensive to maintain in the 20th century, and they were gradually sold off. Some college barges are still to be seen on the river, used as reception facilities by riverfront hotels, such as The Swan at Streatley, Berkshire, which has the former Wadham College barge.

== Today ==
Ceremonial barges are sometimes used in historical reenactments and wedding ceremonies in Polynesia.

Religious ceremonies are still conducted aboard barges in the Royal Barge Procession of Thailand. The royal barge is rowed by fifty oarsmen, steered by two steersmen, and commanded by two officers. The crew is rounded out by a flagman, a chantman, and a signalman. Bangkok has a museum devoted entirely to royal barges.

Barges built to provide people with scenic trips down rivers developed along with the growing middle class in Europe and the United States. Modern pleasure barges, such as those that travel the wine regions of France, can include such amenities as DVD players, exercise equipment, onboard kitchens and water closets, skylit passenger cabins, spa pools and stereo systems. The luxury hotel barges of Europe are even crewed by a master chef and house keepers, and piloted by an experienced captain all of which live on board to care for the guests who are staying with them. Most of these barges were originally built to be commercial barges carrying grain and coal along the rivers and canals. It is only in more recent times that they are being renovated to become today's modern pleasure barges.

== Art ==
The Romantic period of art in Europe was fascinated with mundane objects elevated to luxurious heights, making the pleasure barge an attractive subject. Paul Delaroche chose a state barge as his setting to depict the historical figure Cardinal Richelieu in an 1892 painting. About the same time, Ludwig II of Bavaria had a sketch drawn up for an elaborate gilded barge with the sea god Neptune at its prow and a carved, elevated canopy, reached by a wrought iron staircase and topped by an angel holding aloft the royal crown.

== See also ==
- Royal barge
- Hotel barge
- Pleasure craft
- Water taxi
