= Barbarossa Hotel =

Hotel in Konstanz, Germany

- Native name: Miehle Hotel und Gaststätten GmbH
- Industry: Hotel
- Founded: 1419
- Headquarters: Obermarkt 8–12, 78462 Konstanz, Konstanz (district) (Baden-Württemberg), Germany
- Key people: Florian Mehle (manager)
- Website: www.hotelbarbarossa.de

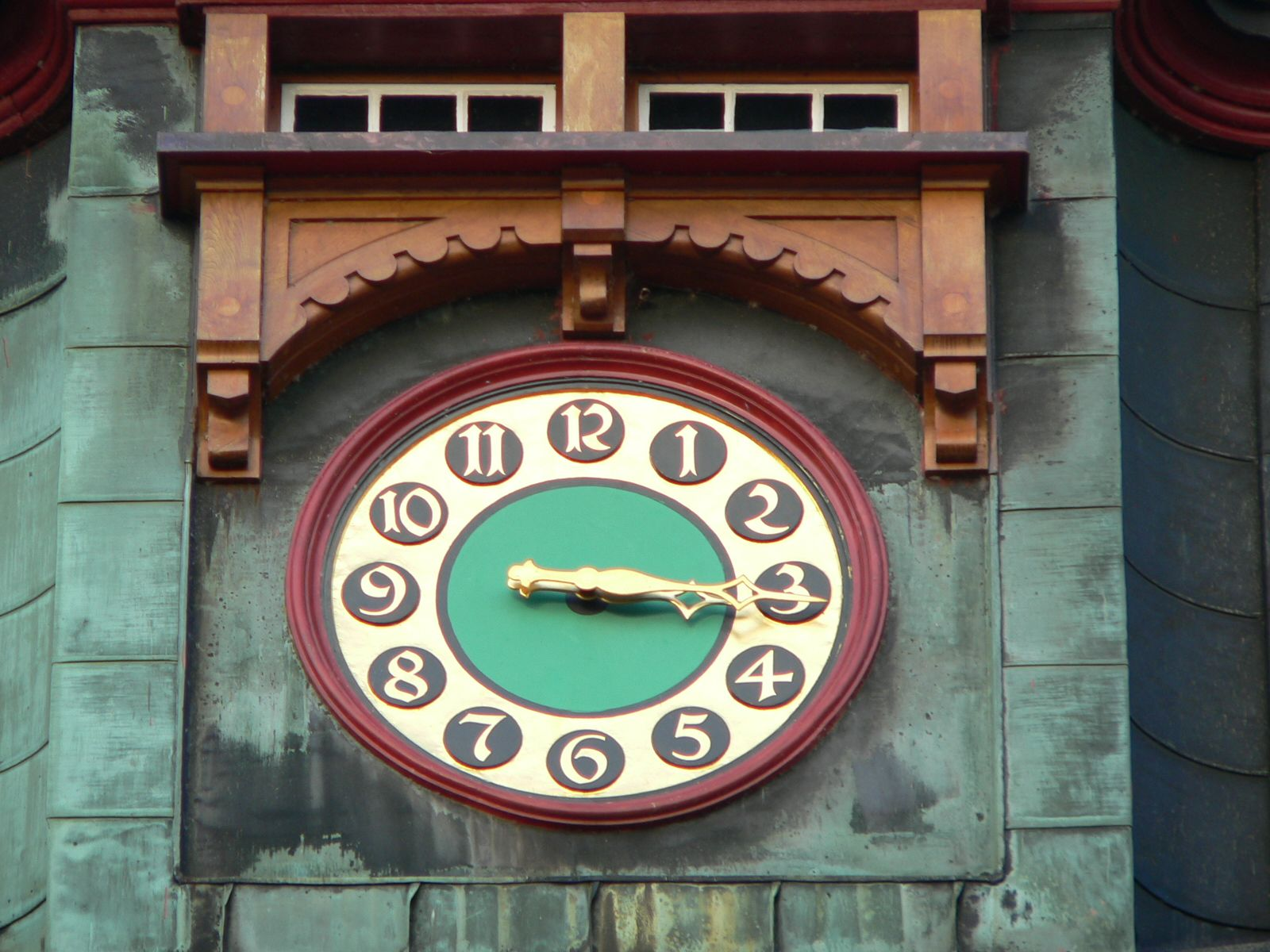
Clock on the hotel wall

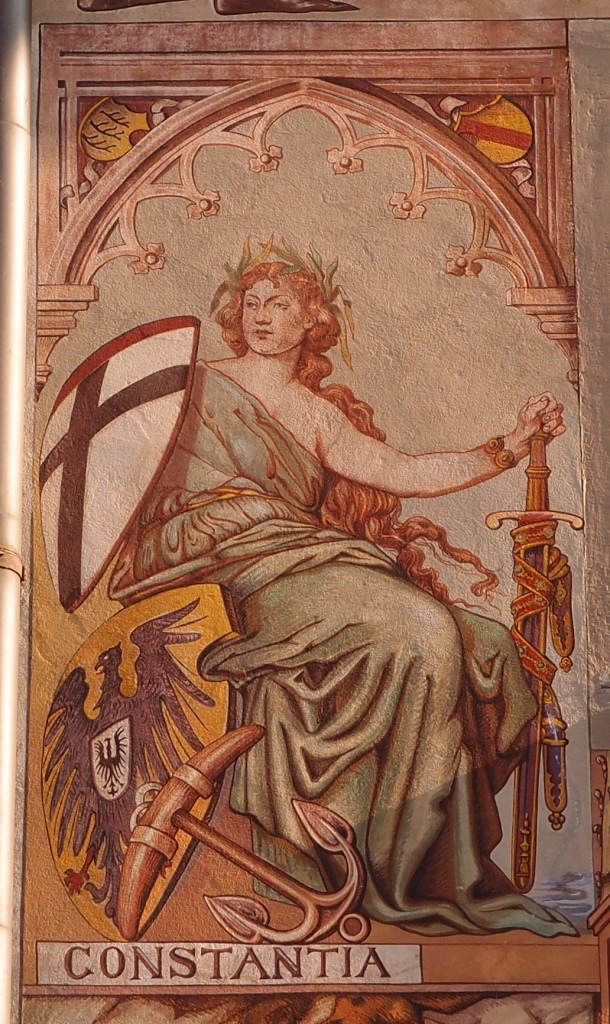
Painting in the hotel

Barbarossa Hotel is the oldest hotel in Konstanz, Germany located on the historic Obermarkt square, where two old taverns, "Haus zum Egli" and "Haus zum Kemlin", were first documented in 1419. The later hotel name was after the Emperor Frederick Barbarossa, who concluded the Peace of Constance.

In 19th century the hotel walls were decorated with paintings and today visitors can use the restaurant with seats also outside on the square.

== See also ==
- List of oldest companies
