= Bucentaur =

State barge of the doges of Venice

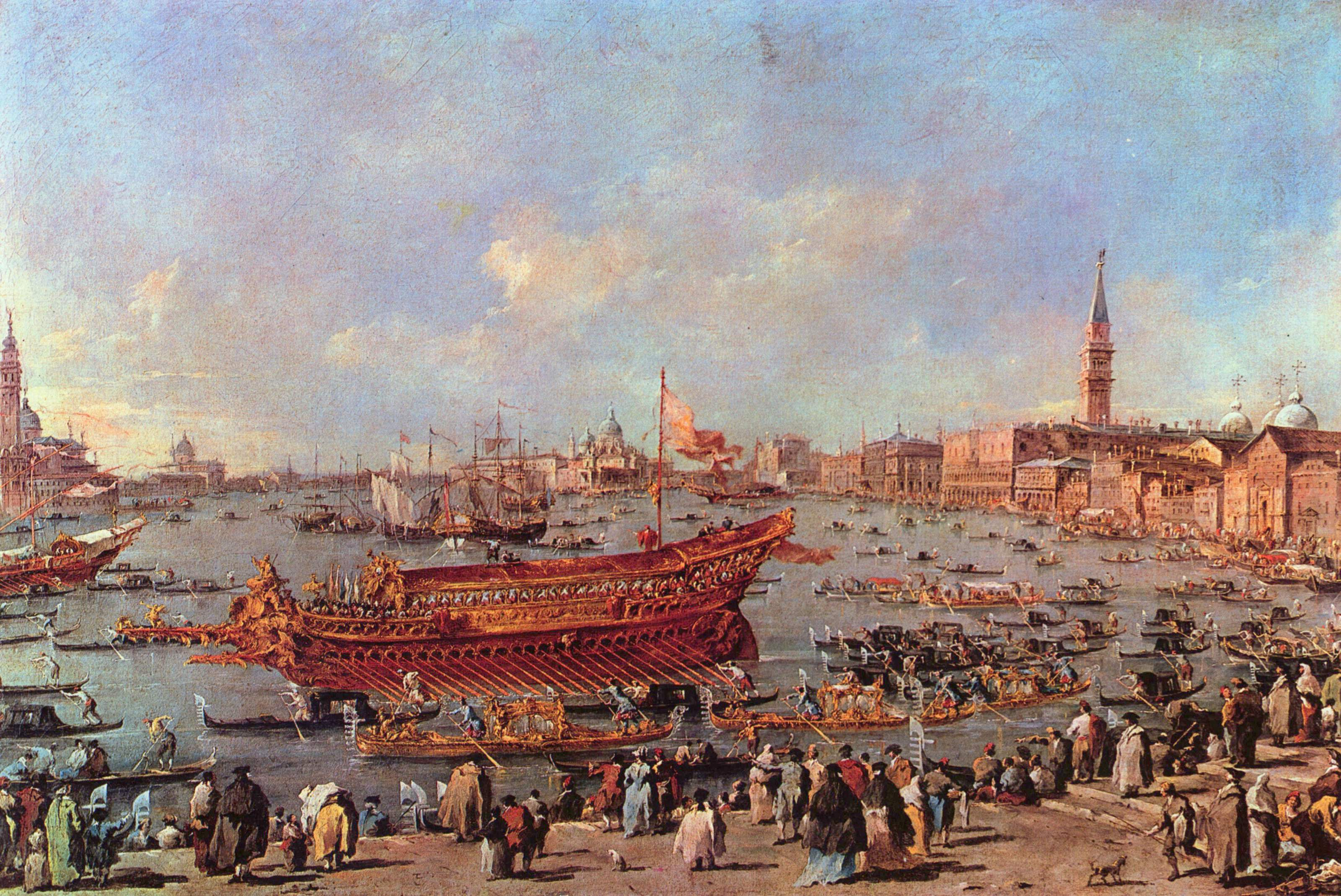
The Doge on the Bucintoro near the Riva di Sant'Elena (c. 1766–70) by Francesco Guardi

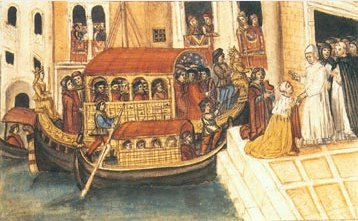
An anonymous miniature, Sbarco dal Bucintoro del doge Sebastiano Ziani al Convento della Carità (The Doge Sebastiano Ziani Disembarking from the Bucentaur for the Convent of Charity, 16th century)

The bucentaur (/bjuːˈsɛntɔːr/ bew-SEN-tor; bucintoro in Italian and Venetian) was the ceremonial barge of the doges of Venice. It was used every year on Ascension Day (Festa della Sensa) up to 1798 to take the doge out to the Adriatic Sea to perform the "Marriage of the Sea" – a ceremony that symbolically wedded Venice to the sea.

Scholars believe there were four major barges, the first significant bucentaur having been built in 1311. The last and most magnificent of the historic bucentaurs made its maiden voyage in 1729 in the reign of Doge Alvise III Sebastiano Mocenigo. Depicted in paintings by Canaletto and Francesco Guardi, the ship was 35 m (115 ft) long and more than 8 metres (26 ft) high. A two-deck floating palace, its main salon had a seating capacity of 90. The doge's throne was in the stern, and the prow bore a figurehead representing Justice with sword and scales. The barge was propelled by 168 oarsmen, and another 40 sailors were required to man it.

The ship was destroyed in 1798 on Napoleon's orders to symbolize his victory in conquering Venice. In February 2008, the Fondazione Bucintoro announced a €20 million project to rebuild the 1729 bucentaur. Work started on 15 March 2008 at the Arsenale shipyard and naval dock.

== Origin of the name ==
The origin of the name bucintoro is obscure, but one possibility is that it is derived from the Venetian burcio, a traditional term for a lagoon vessel, and in oro, meaning covered in gold. On the other hand, man of letters Francesco Sansovino (1521–1586) proposed, based on documents dating from 1293, that it was named after an earlier boat built at the Arsenale shipyard called the navilium duecentorum hominum (lit. 'of two hundred naval men'). It has also been suggested that the vessel was named after the ship Centaurus referred to by Virgil when describing the funeral rites observed by Aeneas to honour his father's death; the bucentaur was twice the size of the ship mentioned in the Aeneid. The name may also derive from Latin buccinator and refer to the trumpets and horns that were played on board. The term bucintoro was Latinized in the Middle Ages as bucentaurus on the analogy of an alleged Greek word βουκένταυρος (boukentauros) meaning "ox-centaur", from βους (bous, 'ox') and κένταυρος (kentauros, 'centaur'). The common supposition was that the name derived from a creature of a man with the head of an ox, a figure of which served as the barge's figurehead. This derivation is, however, fanciful; the word βουκένταυρος is unknown in Greek mythology, and representations of the "figurehead" of the bucentaurs in fact depict the Lion of Saint Mark.

The name "bucentaur" seems, indeed, to have been given to any great and sumptuous Venetian vessels. Du Cange quotes from the chronicle of the Doge Andrea Dandolo (r. 1343–1354): "... cum uno artificioso et solemni Bucentauro, super quo venit usque ad S. Clementem, quo jam pervenerat principalior et solemnior Bucentaurus cum consiliariis, &c [... with a well-wrought and stately Bucentaur, upon which he came to San Clemente, where a more important and more stately Bucentaur had already arrived with his advisors, etc. ...]".

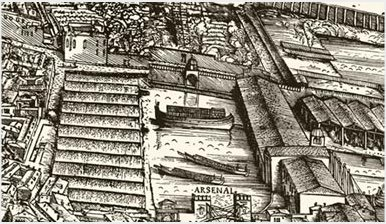
The earliest known depiction of a bucentaur, from Jacopo de' Barbari's Pianta di Venezia (Map of Venice, 1500)

The term was also used to describe a 16th-century sumptuous transport boat, built and decorated in Modena, to celebrate the marriage of Lucrezia, the daughter of Ercole II d'Este, Duke of Ferrara, to the Duke of Urbino.

== The vessels ==
Before the age of the bucentaurs, it is probable that for ceremonies in the Venetian Lagoon the doge was simply assigned a small galley from the Venetian fleet. As Venice's wealth increased due to its naval power, plans were made for a special ship to be built. This is evidenced by the promissioni – sacramental pledges spoken by the doges when they were sworn into office – of Reniero Zeno of 1252, Lorenzo Tiepolo of 1268 and Giovanni Soranzo of 1312 which mention the construction of a bucentaur in the Arsenale shipyard and naval depot.

=== The 1311 bucentaur ===
Historians agree that four major barges were built. While there are believed to have been earlier vessels, the bucentaur of 1311 is regarded as the first significant one, for on 17 August 1311 the promissione was amended to add the statement "quod Bucentaurus Domini ducis fiat per Dominium et teneatur in Arsenatu" ("... that a Bucentaur should be made for the Lord Doge for his rule, and it should be held in the Arsenale"). This was the first time that Venetian law had provided that the expense of building the bucentaur was to be borne by the public budget. The two-decked bucentaur had a tiemo (canopy) with two sections, one in purple velvet for the doge, the other in red velvet for Venetian nobles. The historian Marino Sanuto the Younger, in his work De origine, situ et magistratibus urbis Venetae (On the Origin, Site and Officials of the City of Venice), also described the ship as bearing a sculpture of Justice.

The bucentaur was used not only for the Marriage of the Sea ceremony, but also for other state functions such as festivals celebrating the Virgin Mary and the bearing of newly crowned dogaressas (the wives of doges) to the Doge's Palace. On 6 May 1401, a law was passed to prohibit the doge from making private use of the bucentaur.

Documents mention the construction of another bucentaur in 1449 larger than the 1311 one, but little is known about this vessel. The earliest known image of a bucentaur appeared in Jacopo de' Barbari's monumental woodcut Pianta di Venezia (Map of Venice) which was published in 1500. This work pictured a bucentaur afloat in the Arsenale without oars or decoration save for a large wooden sculpture of Justice in the bow. A similar illustration was produced by Andrea Valvassore between 1517 and 1525.

=== The 1526 bucentaur ===
On 10 May 1526, Marino Sanuto the Younger recorded that on "Ascension Day the serenissimo [the Most Serene One – the doge] went in the new bucintoro to wed the sea", adding that "it was a beautiful work, larger and wider than the other one". The proportions and rich decoration of this Bucentaur, built in the reign of Doge Andrea Gritti, became the model for successive versions of the ship. It had two decks and 42 oars, and was adorned with figures of lions with a sculpture of Justice at the prow (preserved in the Museum of Naval History in Venice). The movable canopy of the vessel was covered with red fabric on the outside, and blue fabric with gold stars inside.

This bucentaur was frequently referred to in Venetian chronicles. It was on the ship that in July 1574 Henry III of France was conveyed with the doge down the Grand Canal to the Ca' Foscari where he stayed during his visit to Venice. The ship was also used to transport the newly crowned Dogaressa Morosina Morosini-Grimani to the Doge's Palace on 4 May 1597. This event was the subject of numerous etchings and paintings by Giacomo Franco, Andrea Vicentino, Sebastian Vrancx and anonymous artists.

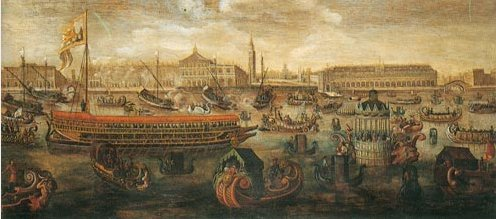
Sebastian Vrancx's Trionfo sul Bucintoro in Bacino San Marco di Morosina Morosini Grimani (The Triumphal Entry of Morosina Morosini-Grimani on the Bucentaur into St. Mark's Basin, 17th century)

=== The 1606 bucentaur ===
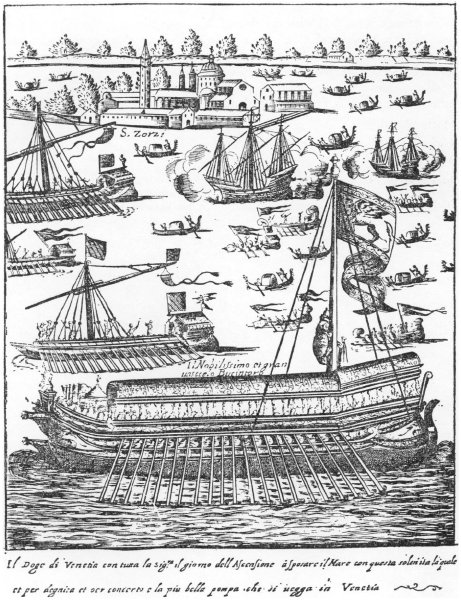
A bucentaur, from the Folger Shakespeare Library's copy of Giacomo Franco's Habiti d'hvomeni et donne venetiane (Dress of Venetian Men and Ladies, 1609?)

Despite Venice's economic and maritime decline, in 1601 at the behest of the Doge Marino Grimani, the Venetian Senate decided to have a new bucentaur built at the cost of 70,000 ducats; although the existing one was still in service, experts regarded it as too old. The designer of the new ship is unknown, but he was selected from among the most qualified marangoni (ships' carpenters) of the Arsenale. The work was supervised by Marco Antonio Memmo, the sovraprovveditore (overseer of the provveditore) of the Arsenale. The new vessel was approved and praised by all on its maiden voyage to the Lido with the newly elected Doge Leonardo Donato on Ascension Day, 10 May 1606.

The third barge was modelled after its predecessors, its decorations influenced by late-Renaissance forms. Contemporary illustrations show that the sides of the bucentaur were covered by mythical figures of sirens riding seahorses, and that the loggias were supported by curved dolphins amongst intertwined garlands and scrollwork taking on the form of monstrous hydras extending from the ends of the two bow spurs. It was once believed that most of the wooden sculptures, including a large sculpture of Mars, two lions of St. Mark positioned on either side of the stern, and the figurehead of Justice (dressed in apparel made by the San Daniele Monastery), were the work of the renowned Venetian sculptor Alessandro Vittoria, but research has revealed the names of the brothers Agostino and Marcantonio Vanini of Bassano who were praised as "authors of carvings of marvellous beauty". After more than a century of service, in 1719 a decision was made to demolish the ship.

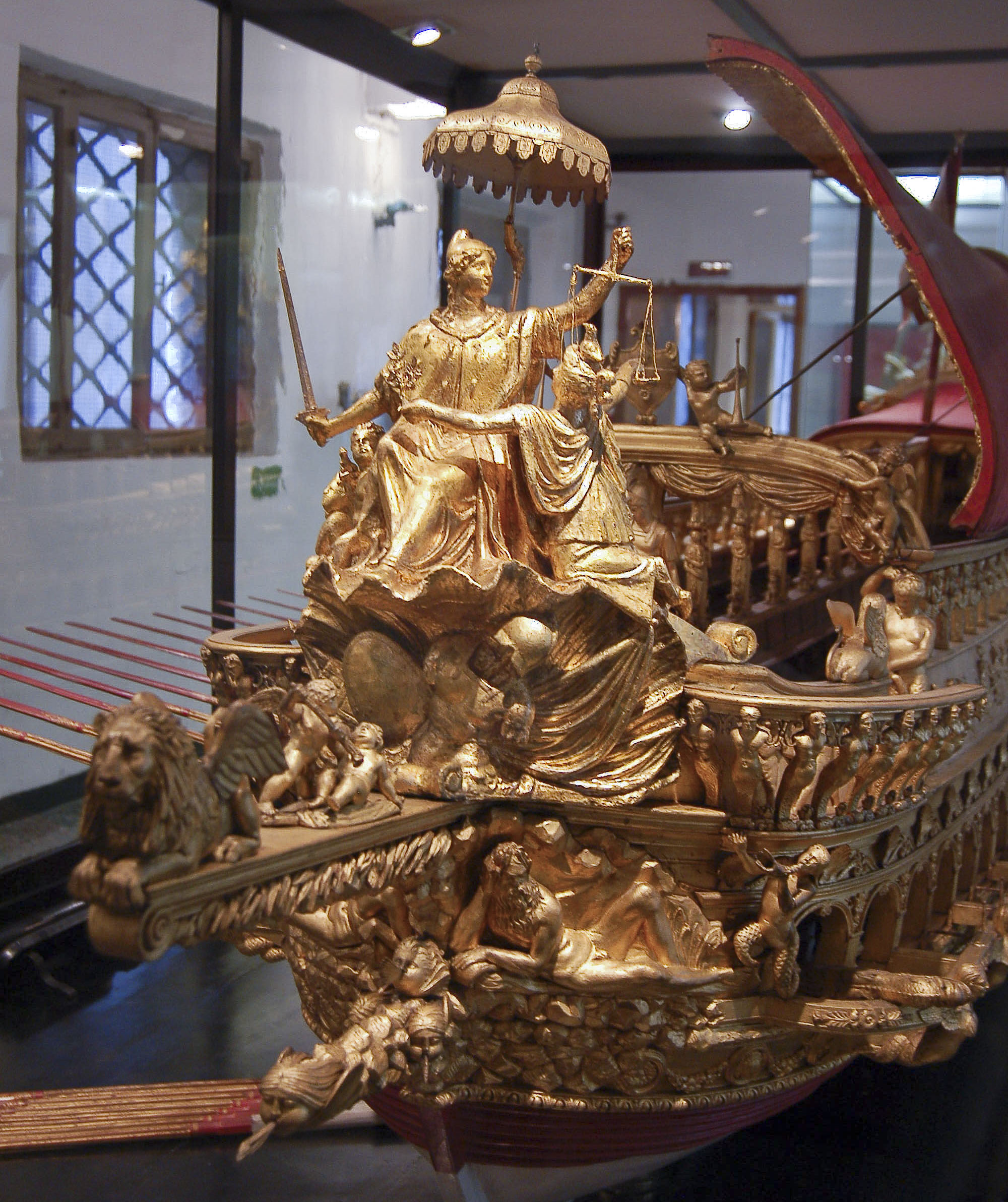
A model of the bucentaur's figurehead in the Museum of Naval History in Venice

=== The 1727 bucentaur ===
The last and most magnificent of the historic bucentaurs was commissioned by the Senate in 1719, and the construction of it began in the Arsenale in 1722. The ship was designed by Michele Stefano Conti, the protomagistro dei marangoni (head master of the ships' carpenters). Wooden sculpting work was assigned to Antonio Corradini, as was testified by the phrase "Antonii Coradini sculptoris Inventum" ("invention of the sculptor Antonio Corradini") inscribed near the bow palmette. He was an established sculptor, having already worked on commissions in Austria, Bohemia and Saxony. The gilding, in pure gold leaf, was handled by one Zuanne D'Adamo. Some of the 1606 ship's ornaments and sculptures, including the sculpture of Mars and the two lions of St. Mark, were salvaged and reused. The vessel was 35 m (115 ft) long and more than 8 metres (26 ft) high. A two-deck floating palace, its main salon was covered in red velvet, had 48 windows set in a huge, elaborately carved baldacchino or canopy, and had a seating capacity of 90. The doge's throne was in the stern, and the prow bore the traditional figurehead representing Justice with sword and scales. The barge was propelled by 168 oarsmen rowing in teams of four on its 42 oars each 11 metres (36 ft) in length; another 40 sailors were required to man it. Only the most handsome and sturdy youths of the Arsenale were selected for the ship's crew. The new bucentaur made its début on Ascension Day 1729 in the reign of Doge Alvise III Sebastiano Mocenigo. The event was officially recorded, and the splendour of the vessel praised with sonnets and publications such as that by Antonio Maria Lucchini entitled La Nuova regia su l'acque nel Bucintoro nuovamente eretto all'annua solenne funzione del giorno dell'Ascensione di Nostro Signore (The New Palace upon the Waters of the Newly Built Bucentaur at the Annual Solemn Function of the Day of the Ascension of Our Lord, 1751).

The German writer Johann Wolfgang von Goethe, in his work Italienische Reise (Italian Journey, 1816–1817) which was an account of his travels in Italy between 1786 and 1787, described the bucentaur on 5 October 1786 in these terms:

Um mit einem Worte den Begriff des Bucentaur auszusprechen, nenne ich ihn eine Prachtgaleere. Der ältere, von dem wir noch Abbildungen haben, rechtfertigt diese Benennung noch mehr als der gegenwärtige, der uns durch seinen Glanz über seinen Ursprung verblendet. ...

Ich komme immer auf mein Altes zurück. Wenn dem Künstler ein echter Gegenstand gegeben ist, so kann er etwas Echtes leisten. Hier war ihm aufgetragen, eine Galeere zu bilden, die wert wäre, die Häupter der Republik am feierlichsten Tage zum Sakrament ihrer hergebrachten Meerherrschaft zu tragen, und diese Aufgabe ist fürtrefflich ausgeführt. Das Schiff ist ganz Zierat, also darf man nicht sagen: mit Zierat überladen, ganz vergoldetes Schnitzwerk, sonst zu keinem Gebrauch, eine wahre Monstranz, um dem Volke seine Häupter recht herrlich zu zeigen. Wissen wir doch: das Volk, wie es gern seine Hüte schmückt, will auch seine Obern prächtig und geputzt sehen. Dieses Prunkschiff ist ein rechtes Inventarienstück, woran man sehen kann, was die Venezianer waren und sich zu sein dünkten.

[In order to express the concept of the Bucentaur with one word, I call it a Prachtgaleere [magnificent galley]. The older one, of which we still have illustrations, justifies this designation even more than the present one, as we are dazzled by the glare of its origin. ...

I always return to my old theme. If a genuine object is given to the artist, then he can achieve something genuine. Here was laid on him the responsibility of constructing a galley worthy of carrying the heads of the Republic on the most solemn day to consecrate their traditional dominion over the sea, and this task is carried out excellently. The ship is itself an ornament; therefore one may not say that it is overloaded with ornaments, and only a mass of gilded carvings that are otherwise useless. In reality it is a monstrance, in order to show the people that their leaders are indeed wonderful. Nevertheless, we know this: the people, who are fond of decorating their hats, also want to see their betters in splendour and dressed up. This grandiose ship is quite an item of inventory and shows what the Venetians were and imagined themselves to be.]

In 1798, Napoleon ordered this bucentaur to be destroyed, less for the sake of its golden decorations than as a political gesture to symbolize his victory in conquering the city. French soldiers broke up the carved wooden portions and the gold decorations of the ship into small pieces, carted them to the island of San Giorgio Maggiore and set fire to them to recover the gold. The ship burned for three days, and French soldiers used 400 mules to carry away its gold. The decorative elements of the vessel that survived the flames are preserved in the Museo Civico Correr in Venice, and there is a detailed scale model of the vessel in the Arsenale. The hull survived and, renamed the Prama Hydra and armed with four cannons, was stationed at the mouth of the Lido's port where it served as a coastal battery. Subsequently, the ship was returned to the Arsenale and used as a prison ship until it was entirely destroyed in 1824. Admiral Amilcare Paulucci had the engineer Giovanni Casoni make a 1:10 scale model of the 1727 Bucentaur before it was destroyed. The model is currently kept at the Naval History Museum in Venice.

== Marriage of the Sea ceremony ==
The Return of the Bucentaur to the Molo on Ascension Day (1730) by Canaletto

The "Marriage of the Adriatic", or more correctly "Marriage of the Sea" (in Italian, Sposalizio del Mare), was a ceremony symbolizing the maritime dominion of Venice. The ceremony, established about 1000 to commemorate the Doge Pietro II Orseolo's conquest of Dalmatia, was originally one of supplication and placation, Ascension Day being chosen as that on which the doge set out on his expedition. The form it took was a solemn procession of boats, headed by the doge's nave (ship), from 1311 the Bucentaur, putting out to sea from the port of Venice Lido.

== Attempted modern reconstruction ==
In February 2008, plans to rebuild the bucentaur destroyed in 1798 were announced. More than 200 shipbuilders, woodcarvers and jewelers started work on 15 March 2008 at the Arsenale. It was reported in the Italian press that it would take two years for the new Bucentaur to be constructed. However, Colonel Giorgio Paterno, the head of Fondazione Bucintoro which was behind the €20 million project, said in March 2008 that they would "build it as fast as we can but are not in a hurry." It was intended that the project would make use of traditional shipbuilding techniques and original materials, including larch and fir wood, and would reproduce the original gold decorations. The foundation was supported by businessmen in the Veneto and Lombardy regions, but it also invited the then French President, Nicolas Sarkozy, to make a financial contribution, as a goodwill gesture to compensate for Napoleon's "vandalism" in destroying the 1729 vessel.

Fondazione Bucintoro hoped that the vessel would become "the most visited floating museum in the world" and also saw the project as a means to "help Venice recover its former glory and its old spirit". According to Paterno, "Invaded by so many million tourists, the city risks losing its identity, losing its cultural connection with its own history. It's not enough to live in the future, the city needs to connect with and remember its glorious past." In February 2014, in a gesture of reconciliation, France began shipping 600 trunks of oak trees from the forests of the Dordogne, in the region of Aquitaine, to be used for the project, news of a planned documentary to chronicle the ship's reconstruction. At the same time, it was reported that the project was expected to be concluded within five more years. However, some years of inaction followed, said to be due to bureaucracy and shifting priorities. In 2021 a brief revitalization of the project saw some minor carpentry and assembly work. At that time, structural timbers had been created, but the project lacked the millions of euros needed to complete the gilded carvings and ornamentation of the original ship. The remains of the historic vessel, alongside mock-ups and structural cross-sections for the proposed reconstruction, can be seen at the Venice Naval History Museum.

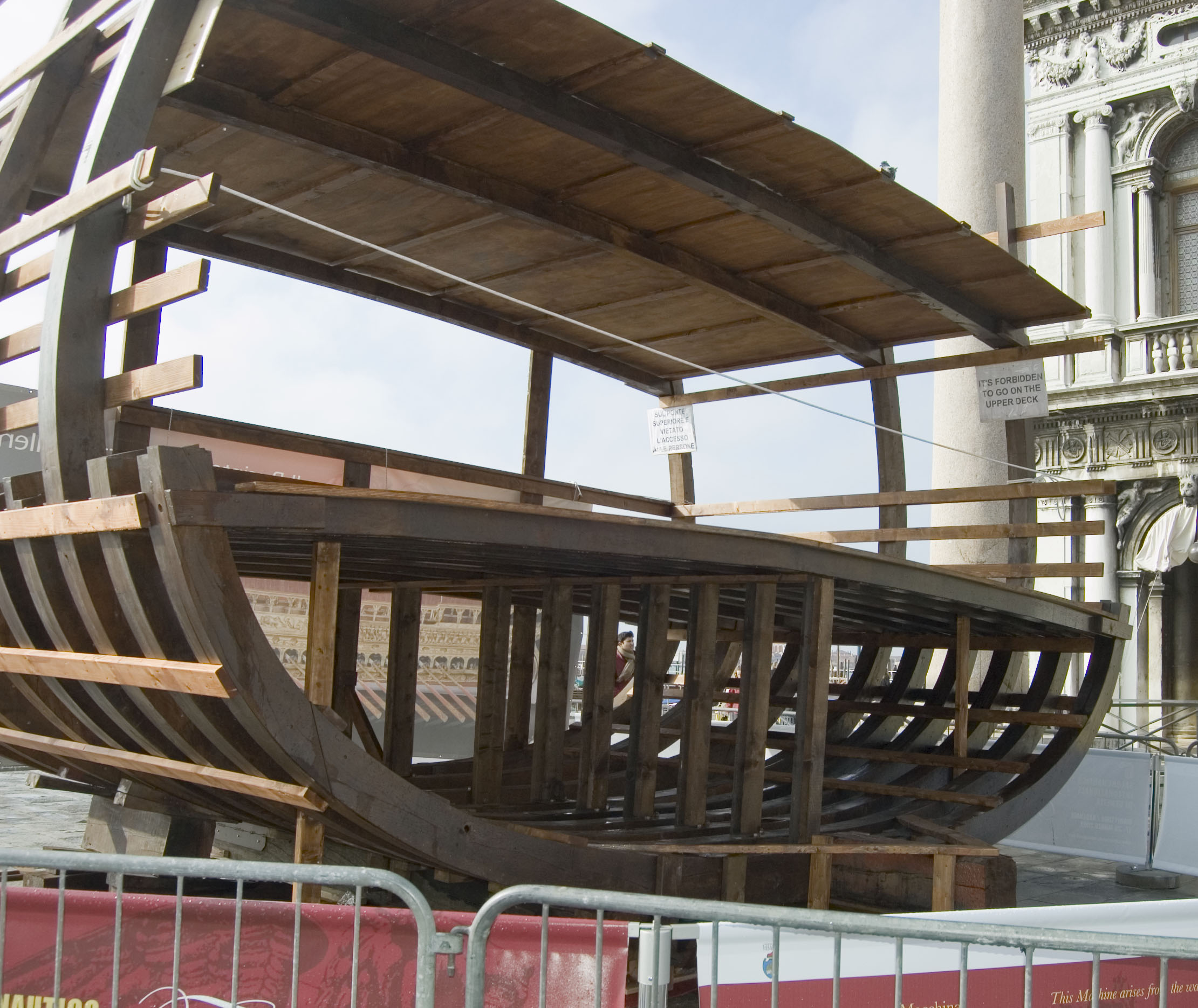
Cross-section of the proposed modern reconstruction, displayed in St. Mark's Square

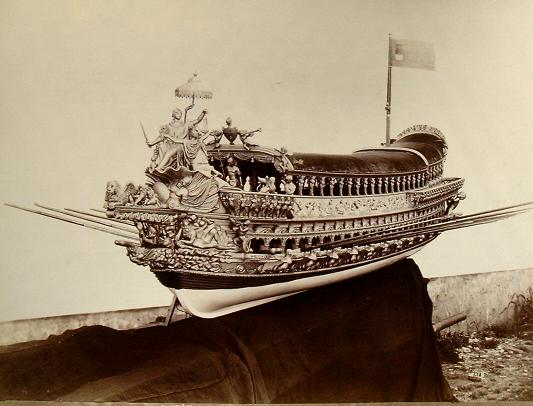
A photograph of a model of the Bucintoro by Italian photographer Carlo Naya (1816–1882)

== See also ==
- History of the Republic of Venice
- Italy in the Middle Ages
- The Doge on the Bucintoro near the Riva di Sant'Elena, an oil on canvas by Francesco Guardi
