= 1177 in Italy =

- Decades
- See also: History of Italy; Timeline of Italian history; List of years in Italy

Events during the year 1177 in Italy.

== Events ==
- Treaty of Venice : The Treaty of Venice or Peace of Venice, 1177, was an important peace treaty between the papacy and its allies, the north Italian city-states of the Lombard League, and Frederick I, Holy Roman Emperor. The Norman Kingdom of Sicily also took part in negotiations and the treaty thereby determined the political course of all Italy for the next several years.
- 1 August − Holy Roman Empire renounces any claims on the territory of Rome.
- Consecration of The Chiesa di San Salvatore (of the Holy Saviour) in Venice, by Pope Alexander III
- Construction of the Romanesque Basilica of San Lorenzo in Verona
- 13 February Joan of England (October 1165 – 4 September 1199) the seventh child of Henry II of England and Eleanor of Aquitaine married William II of Sicily at Palermo Cathedral.

== Births ==
- Saint Sylvester Gozzolini (Italian: Silvestro Guzzolini; 1177 – 26 November 1267), an Italian saint, the founder of the religious order known as the Sylvestrines
