= Amilcare Paulucci =

Italian aristocrat (1773–1845)

Amilcare Ambrosio Paulucci delle Roncole
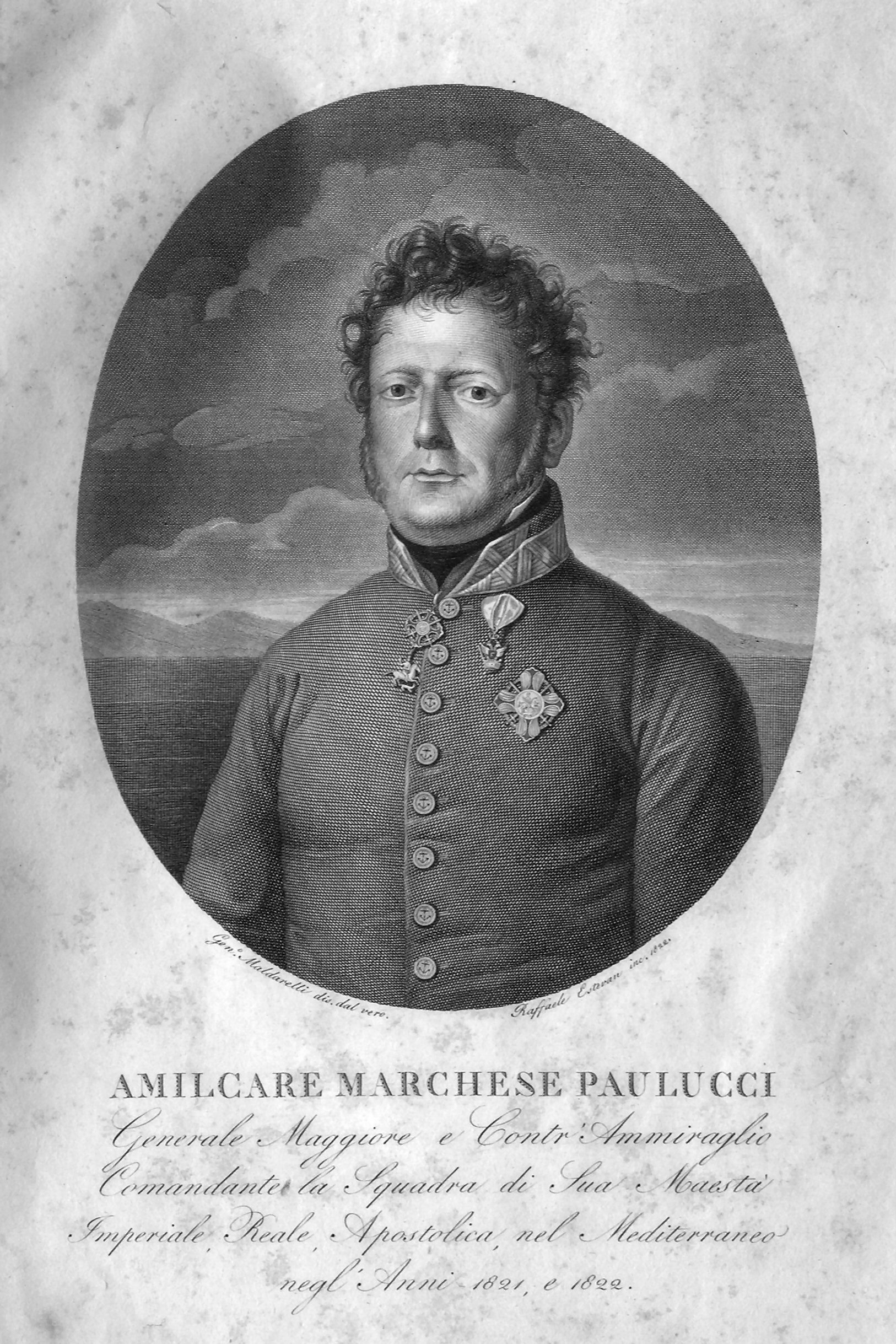
- Paulucci in 1821
- Born: 11 January 1773; Modena
- Died: 17 March 1845 (aged 72); Padua
- Occupation: Admiral

The Marquis Amilcare Ambrosio Paulucci delle Roncole (11 January 1773 – 17 March 1845) was an aristocrat from Modena, in what is now Italy, who served in the navy of the Bourbon Kingdom of Naples from 1787 to 1799. He then joined the French service during the wars of the French Revolution and the First French Empire. He served in the Parthenopean Republic, the Cisalpine Republic and the Kingdom of Italy. While commanding a squadron in the Adriatic in 1808 he was captured by the British and held until 1812. He joined the army in 1813 and served in the expedition against Austria, where he was wounded. When the French Empire collapsed in 1814, he helped arrange the transfer of officers and troops in Italy to the Austrian army. He became a major general in the Austrian army in July 1814. In 1818, he again became involved in naval affairs, and in 1824 became commander in chief of the Austrian navy based in Venice, a position he held until 1844.

== Early years ==
Amilcare Ambrosio Paulucci delle Roncole was born in Modena on 11 January 1776 to the Marquis Giuseppe Paulucci delle Roncole (1726–1785) and Claudia Scutellari Ajani. His mother was a noblewoman from Parma, former lady of honor to the Queen of Spain. His father came from the aristocracy of Pesaro and had obtained the title of "marquis" in 1738. His uncle, Massimo, had been an officer in the navy of the Kingdom of Naples. His younger brother Filippo Paulucci (1779–1849) became a soldier, and served in the Austrian, Italian, Russian and Sardinian armies. Another brother, Luigi (1777–1844), served the Napoleonic Kingdom of Italy.

Amilcare's father settled in Modena but visited various European courts as representative of Francesco III d'Este, Duke of Modena. In 1767, the duke appointed him secretary of state and president of the ministries of Commerce and Agriculture. Amilcare's father died on 26 November 1785 when Amilcare was 9 years old. His uncle Massimo had Amilcare admitted to the Naval Academy of the Kingdom of Naples in Portici on 19 April 1787. After his studies he joined the frigate, Sirena. He was appointed sottobrigadiere dei guardiamarina in November 1792, spent two years sailing on square rigged ships and then served in Naples for a period. In April 1796, he sailed on the xebec Diligente, which was captured by Tunisian pirates off the island of Ustica on 21 June 1796. He had to wait ten months before being freed for ransom. He returned to Naples on 1 April 1797. Paulucci and his commander were tried and acquitted for the loss of the ship. He was promoted to alfiere di vascello in August 1798 and joined the corvette Fortuna.

== French service ==
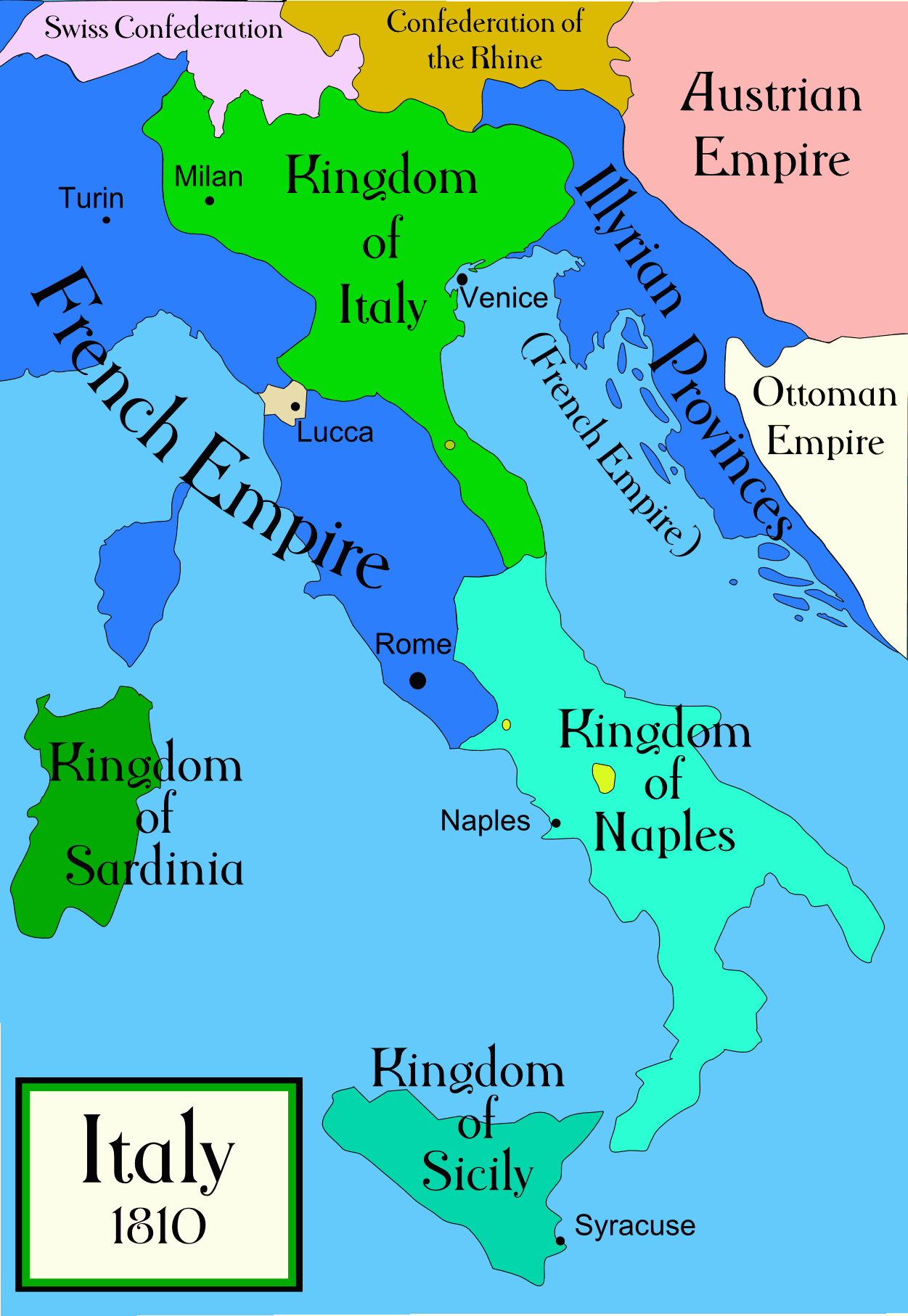
Italy around 1810. The Kingdom of Italy had replaced the Cisalpine Republic and its successor Italian Republic

Paulucci was in Sicily in January 1799 when the Neapolitan court arrived there, having fled from Naples. He asked and obtained leave to go to Naples, where he arrived on 20 February 1799. He was admitted to the navy of the short-lived Parthenopean Republic in Naples on 1 March 1799 with the rank of frigate captain. He was at once transferred to the French navy and probably left Naples with the general staff in May 1799. In the spring of 1800, he was among the defenders during the siege of Genoa, where he claimed to have been promoted to capitano di vascello.

After the Battle of Marengo the French navy agreed to readmit Paulucci as enseigne de vaisseau. He chose to resign, and on 21 July 1800 entered the service of the Cisalpine Republic as director of the "office for all water armaments", although at this time the Cisalpine Republic had no navy. The war between the Cisalpine Republic and Austria ended on 9 February 1801 with the Treaty of Lunéville. In February 1801, he was promoted to battalion commander, and on 23 April 1802 was appointed head of the navy. It only had a few small boats, and Paulucci was more concerned with defending the coasts and organizing the ports and the merchant navy. At the end of December 1803, he was appointed brigadier general. While in Milan he married Maddalena Malacrida, a noblewoman. They had three children.

Paulucci was appointed secretary general of the Ministry of War in September 1805, and soon after was made inspector general of the navy. After the Battle of Austerlitz (2 December 1805), Amilcare was able to move from the port of Ravenna to the Venetian Arsenal as commander of the new Royal Italian Navy. This was really the old Venetian navy, which had been under Austrian command from 1797 to 1805. New ships were acquired after Venice was annexed to the Kingdom of Italy, and Venetian and Dalmatian officers and men from the Austrian navy joined the Italian service. Napoleon planned to use Venice as a base for operations against Austria in the Balkans, so the arsenal was built up. For a year Paulucci worked with the French commissioner general in organizing the Royal Italian Navy. At the start of October 1807, he was given command of a fleet of brigantines and corvettes in the Adriatic and Ionian seas.

Paulucci was captured by the British on 25 March 1808 near Corfu and interned in Malta. He hoped to be exchanged for British prisoners, but the Italians did not have any. He eventually fled from Malta and reached Venice on 27 January 1812. He had violated his oath by leaving Malta, so was in an awkward legal position that was only rectified on 11 July 1813 when he was officially exchanged for 15 British prisoners. On 15 August 1813, he was transferred to the army with the rank of adjutant commander and was appointed chief of staff of the 3rd Italian Lieutenancy commanded by General Domenico Pino. On 14 September 1813 he was wounded in combat at Lipizza, near Trieste.

In November 1813, Paulucci was sent to Bologna to try to organize five volunteer battalions. On 10 December 1814, he met the Neapolitan general Michele Carrascosa (1774–1853) and told him that if Joachim Murat, the King of Naples, proclaimed Italy independent, it would accept Murat as king. On 12 December, he was promoted to brigadier general in the 6th Italian Division of General Carlo Zucchi in Mantua. On 5 March 1814, Paulucci made a reconnaissance in Sassuolo, 15 kilometres (9.3 mi) southwest of Modena, with the 2nd Italian line regiment, while the Neapolitans, now allies of the Austrians, were preparing to attack Reggio. On 9 May, he was appointed by the provisional government of Lombardy as general secretary of the Italian ministry of war and navy. He worked with the Austrian general Annibale Sommariva to arrange the dissolution of the Italian army and the transfer of its units into the Austrian army.

== Austrian service ==
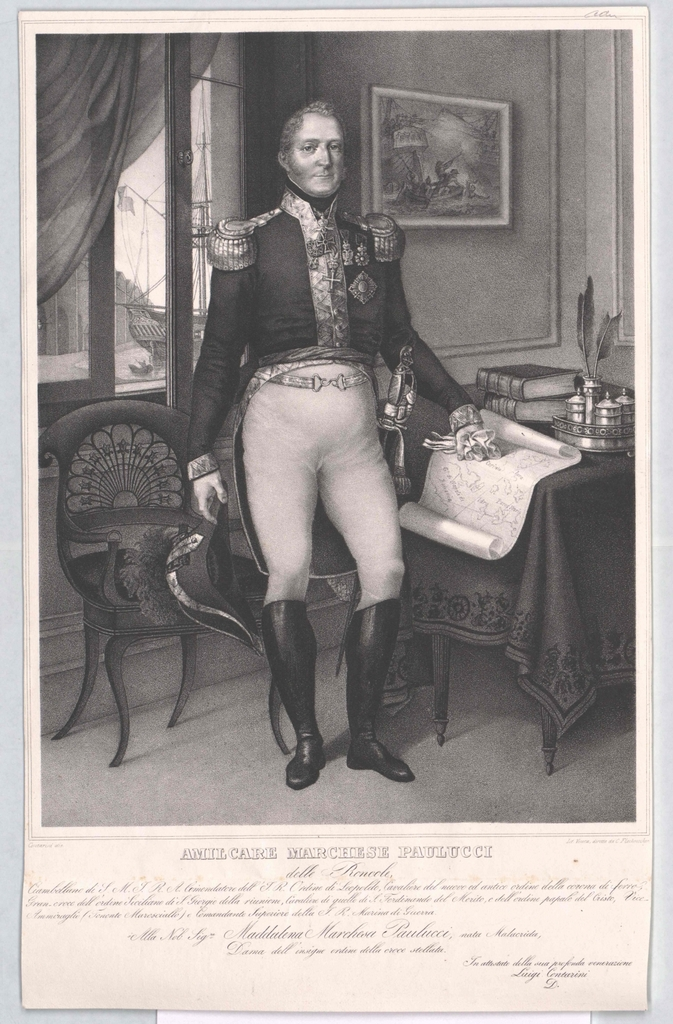
Paulucci c. 1829

On 2 July 1814, Paulucci was admitted to the Austrian service as major general-major in charge of the brigade in Brno. The emperor Francis I of Austria, formally appointed him a Major General in the Austrian army on 18 July 1814. In July 1818, he was assigned to the royal council of war as adviser for the navy. In April 1819, he was charged with thoroughly inspecting all branches of the navy. He was then put in charge of reorganizing the Venice arsenal, the penal colonies and the naval college. He improved the signaling service. In February 1821, he commanded a naval squadron that supported the Austrian expedition to Naples to prevent Ferdinand I of the Two Sicilies from adopting a constitution. His squadron was then charged with defending Austrian merchant ships against Greek pirates during the Greek War of Independence.

In March 1823. Paulucci returned to Venice, and on 10 February 1824 was appointed commander in chief of the navy. Otto von Pirch (1765–1824) wrote of Paulucci, "Among the older men, the most important is the marquis Paulucci, the admiral, it seemed to me. His exterior is that of a courtier, but in conversation he is soon in the sphere of his profession. He asked me if I had seen the arsenal, if I knew the origin of the name. I think it is not very well known. Arsanarsi means in old Venetian to wrap yourself around, to insulate yourself." Paulucci had the engineer Giovanni Casoni make a 1:10 scale model of the 1727 Bucentaur, the floating palace of the Doge of Venice, before it was destroyed in 1824. The model is currently kept at the Naval History Museum in Venice. On 4 March 1826, Francis I appointed Paulucci commander of a naval unit. He was already a major general and commander in chief of the Austrian navy.

Paulucci was promoted to rear admiral in 1829 and vice admiral in 1830. He headed the royal navy until 1844, based in Venice. Almost all the officers were Venetian or Dalmatian, and the service language was Italian. The unit operated effectively against Moroccan privateers in 1829–1830 and during the Syrian expedition of 1840. However, Paulucci resisted introduction of steam-powered vessels and became less effective as a commander as he grew old. He was not aware of the growing support for independence from Austria among the younger officers. When the Bandiera brothers (Note: During the year 1843 the air was full of different conspiracies and various other ill-starred attempts at nationalist uprisings were made. The Bandiera brothers spread propaganda among the officers and enlisted men of the Austrian navy, nearly all Italians, and planned to seize a warship to bombard the city of Messina. Having been betrayed by informants they fled to Corfu early in 1844.) and Domenico Moro deserted early in 1844 he woke up to the problem but acted weakly, and on 21 August 1844 was removed from command and had to retire. Amilcare Paulucci died in Padua on 25 March 1845.

== Sources ==
- Crociani, Piero (2014), "Paulucci delle Roncole, Amilcare Ambrosio", Dizionario Biografico degli Italiani (in Italian), vol. 81
- Ilari, Virgilio (2013), Маркиз Паулуччи Filippo Paulucci delle Roncole (PDF), Società Italiana di Storia Militare / Acies Edizioni Milano
- Kaiserliche Ernennungsurkunde zum Befehlshaber eines Flottenverbandes für den Generalmajor und Oberbefehlshaber der österreichischen Marine Amilcare Paulucci Marchese delle Roncole (in German), Fritz Rudolf Künker GmbH & Co. KG
- Künker Auktion 253 - Orden und Ehrenzeichen 10. Ordensauktion des Hauses Künker: u. a. die Sammlung Friedhelm Beyreiß (in German), Fritz Rudolf Künker GmbH & Co. KG, 2014
- La storia del Bucintoro (in Italian), Fondazione Bucintoro, archived from the original on 2014-02-05
- Negro, Piero del (2014), "Paulucci delle Roncole, Filippo", Dizionario Biografico degli Italiani (in Italian), vol. 81
- Schöndorfer, U. (1977), "Paulucci delle Roncole, Hamilcar Marchese (1773-1845), Admiral", Österreichisches Biographisches Lexikon (in German)
- Villari, Luigi (1911). "Bandiera, Attilio and Emilio" . In Chisholm, Hugh (ed.). Encyclopædia Britannica. Vol. 03 (11th ed.). Cambridge University Press. p. 312.
