= Filippo Paulucci =

Italian general (1779–1849)

Filippo Paulucci delle Roncole
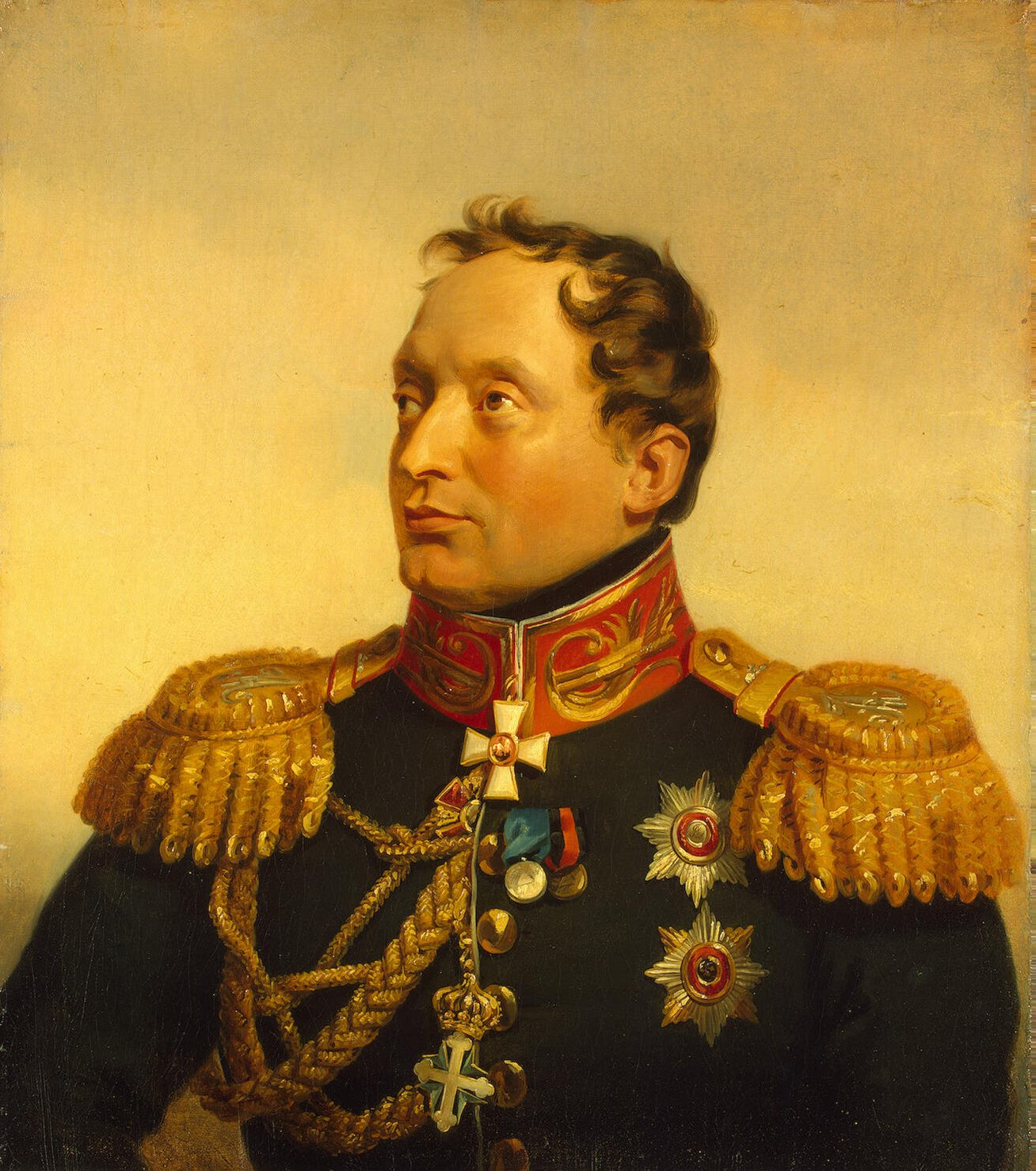
- Portrait by George Dawe, 1825
- Born: 11 September 1779; Modena
- Died: 25 January 1849 (aged 69); Nice
- Military career
- Allegiance: Kingdom of Sardinia (1785–93, 1829–49); Austria (1800); Kingdom of Italy (1806); Russian Empire (1807–29)
- Rank: General (Sardinia); Adjutant General (Russian Empire)
- Conflicts: War of the Alps; Russo-Turkish War; Finnish War; Patriotic War of 1812
- Awards: Order of Saints Maurice and Lazarus; Order of St. George, 3rd Class; Gold Sword for Bravery; Knight Grand Cross of the Order of Saint Anna; Order of Saint Alexander Nevsky

Filippo Paulucci delle Roncole (11 September 1779 – 25 January 1849), also known as Filipp Osipovich Pauluchchi (Russian: Филипп Осипович Паулуччи), was an Italian marquis and army officer, later a general at the services of the Kingdom of Sardinia, the Holy Roman Empire, the Kingdom of Italy, and the Russian Empire.

Born into a prominent Modenese noble family, he served as a junior officer in the Sardinian Army during the War of the First Coalition (1794–96). After brief services in the Cisalpine Republic and Austrian armies in Italy, in 1806 he moved into Russian service and climb the ranks to the position of governor general of Livonia. In 1829 he returned in Piedmont and was appointed full general and Inspector general of Infantry and Cavalry on 1830, only to be dismissed a year later when King Carlo Felice died. In 1848 Paulucci was rumored as a possible Commander-in-Chief for the Sardinian Army, but he refused any involvements. He died peacefully in Nice the following year.

== Life ==
=== First years ===
Filippo Paulucci delle Roncole was born in one of the most notable noble couples of Modena: the family of his father, Giuseppe Paulucci delle Roncole, had held the feudal titles of Vignola, Cividale and Roncole since 1768 and moved from Perugia to Modena in 1753. His mother, Claudia Scutellari, was the daughter of one of Parma noble families, with blood ties to the Spanish court. His older brother was Amilcare Paulucci, who later commanded the Austrian navy. Filippo was the fifth of their eight sons, and was admitted beyond the pages of the King of Sardinia after his father's death in 1785. This position granted him access to the military elite of the Kingdom of Sardinia. In 1792 the Kingdom entered the war against France, and in 1794 Paulucci, just appointed sublieutenant in the 2nd Guards Battalion, was sent to the front-line. Captured in action on 27 April, he was freed after a prisoners exchange on 7 May. He went on fighting the Frenchmen, until he was taken prisoner in Mondovì when the city surrendered to the French army, but subsequently freed after six days following the Armistice of Cherasco. After the French occupation of Turin, he challenged to a duel a French officer who questioned the valor of the Piedmontese soldiers. Since duels were outlawed, Paulucci was arrested and sentenced to a three-week imprisonment. On 19 November 1796, he was promoted to captain and freed from his fealty's oath by the king, who awarded him the Knight's Cross of the Order of Saints Maurice and Lazarus for the stubborn loyalty he had shown.

In 1797 he was listed among the staff officers and aide-de-camp of the Cisalpine Army, probably as aide-de-camp of General Giuseppe Lahoz Ortiz. In 1799, in Mantua he passed in the Austrian service, taking on garrison duties in Passau until, in 1803, the city was given to the Kingdom of Bavaria. In 1804, in Wien, he married Wilhelmina Franziska von Koskull, daughter of a noble Curlandian family.

=== Service in the Russian Empire ===
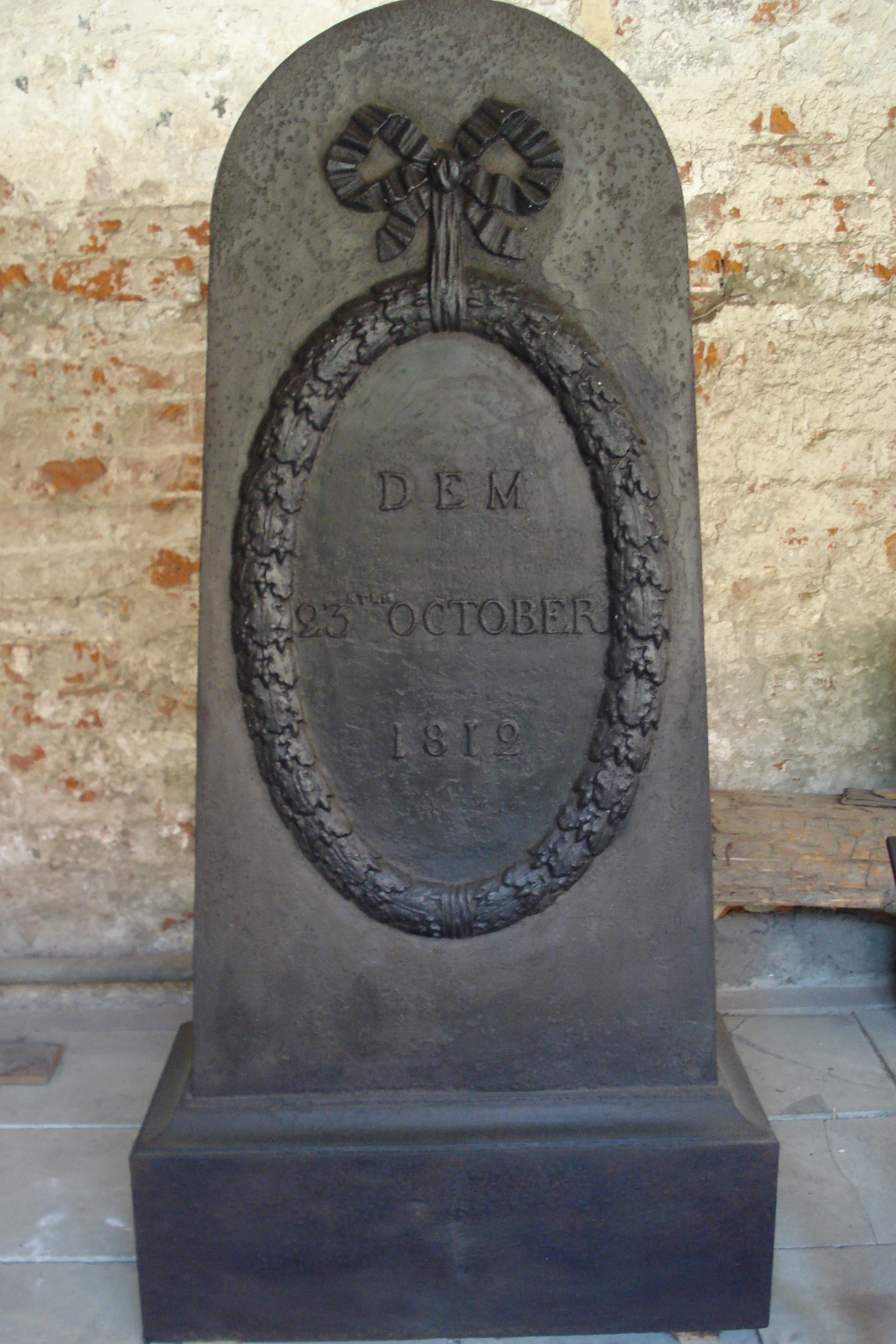
1851 monument commemorating Paulucci in Riga

Paulucci, using his wife's family connections, moved to the Russian service, and in 1807 was promoted colonel, and was sent on a mission to Karađorđe's Serbia. On 7 May 1809 he was awarded the 4th class of the Order of St George "as a reward for prudent orders given whilst in the Finnish army, which helped to defeat the enemy". He took part in the war against the Turks in 1810 and was appointed quartermaster of the Caucasian Army in 1811, then governor of Georgia. In this position he simultaneously had to wage a war against the Turks (from Kars), against the Persians (Karabakh) and insurgents. Paulucci withstood this difficult situation and on 25 April 1812 was awarded the Order of St George 3rd class "as a reward for feats of courage and bravery in the Caucasus against the Persians". However, soon afterwards the preparations for war with Napoleon got underway and Paulucci was summoned to Saint Petersburg to be appointed Army Chief of Staff. However, after a few days, probably due to the opposition of Michael Andreas Barclay de Tolly, he received the post of the governor general of Governorate of Livonia. In 1829 he left the Russian army and went to Italy, where he took command of the army of Piedmont.

=== Return to service in the Kingdom of Sardinia ===
After the constitutional revolution in 1821, the Austrian Empire made political manoeuvres to exclude Carlo Alberto from the succession line, in hope to substitute him with Francesco IV d'Asburgo-Este. Paulucci met, during one of his Italian licence periods, Carlo Felice in Turin, and resolved to do whatever he can to help him. Paulucci's later efforts at the Russian court were indeed essential in stopping the Austrian ambitions at the Verona congress. Memoring these good services, the King Carlo Felice invited Paulucci in Piedmont in 1829, and the two started a close friendship.

After the coup d'état that, in France, brought Louis Philippe d'Orléans to power, Carlo Felice feared internal political struggles, and was eager to reinforce his army. The King eventually called on Paulucci, giving him the ranks of Full General and Inspector general of Infantry and Cavalry on 28 June 1830. The following month, he was then put at the head of the Sardinian Army, with full authority, except for the Carabinieri and four generals with greater seniority. It was recorder that Paulucci was not welcomed by the army and the officers, namely being "sevère [...] jusq'à la rudesse" (rigid to the bone).

Paulucci reorganised the Kingdom's infantry, increasing the number of the troops, modifying the brigade system and facing both enthusiastic approval and bitter critic, especially from the heir to the throne, Prince Carlo Alberto. Carlo Felice died in March 1831, and Paulucci was eventually discharged of all his positions. The new king, only days later, suppressed the rank of Full General in the Sardinian Army.

The name of Paulucci came back to the attention of the public in March 1848, along with that of General Latour, for the command of the Sardinian Army on the field, those being the only two generals of the entire force that had led troops in battle before. Both his age and bad health induced him to make a public refusal of the position, still never offered to him officially.

Filippo Paulucci delle Roncole died in Nice on 25 January 1849, and was later buried in Mirandola, near Modena, in the church of Saints James and Philip.

== Bibliography ==
- Ulrich Einrich Gustav Freiherrn von Schlippenbach, Erinnerungen von einer Reise nach St. Petersburg im Jahre 1814, Hamburg, 1818, II, pp. 5, 88, 154–165, 178–180, 192, 202, 205, 220, 241–42 .
- Carl von Clausewitz, Der Feldzug von 1812 in Russland (Hinterlassene Werke, Band 7, ed. 1862, cc. 32–33, 165, 187) .
- Ferdinando Augusto Pinelli, Storia militare del Piemonte in continuazione di quella del Saluzzo, cioè dalla pace di Aquisgrana sino a' dì nostri, 1748–1850, Torino, T. De Giorgis, 1854, vol. 2, pp. 653–55 e supplemento III pp. 31–33 ; vol. 3, pp. 203–204 .
- Joseph Lehmann, Paulucci und Carlo Alberto, Magazin für die Literatur des Auslandes, Bände 59–60, 1861, pp. 284–286 .
- Julius von Eckardt, Garlieb Merkel, York und Paulucci: Aktenstücke und Beiträge zur Geschichte der Convention von Tauroggen, Leipzig, 1865 .
- Dr. W. von Gutzeit, "Urtheile über den Marquis Paulucci", in Mittheilungen aus dem Gebiete der Geschichte Liv-, Est- und Kurlands, hgb von der Gesellschaft für Geschichte und Alterthumskunde der Ostsee-Provinzen Russlands, Riga, I, 1865, pp. 546–550.
- Василий Александрович Потто (1836–1911), Кавказская война. Том 1. От древнейших времен до Ермолова, 1887, Tom 1, cc. 466–488 (Maркиз ПАУЛУЧЧИ).
- Le Général Marquis Amilcar Paulucci Et Sa Famille, Padoue (1899).
- Le bocche di Cattaro nel 1810: con notizie sul Montenegro: relazione di Luigi Paulucci (1774–1844), delegato napoleonico, con altri documenti e appunti di storia "bocchese": biografie dei Marchesi Paulucci, nei loro legami dalmati, veneti, piemontesi e russi, a cura di Almerigo Apollonio, Istituto regionale per la cultura istriano-fiumano-dalmata, Trieste, Italo Svevo, 2005.
- Maurizio Lo Re, Filippo Paulucci. L'italiano che governò a Riga, Books & Company s.r.l., Livorno, 2006.
