= Festa della Sensa =

Annual feast of the Republic of Venice

Fèsta de ƚa Sènsa
- Date: Ascension Day
- 2025 date: May 29
- 2026 date: May 14
- 2027 date: May 6
- 2028 date: May 25

The Fèsta de ƚa Sènsa was a feast of the Republic of Venice held on the occasion of the feast of the Ascension (in the Venetian language, Sensa) and still celebrated as a recreation today. It commemorated two significant dates in the Republic's history; the first being May 9, 1000, when the Doge Pietro II Orseolo decided to conquer the allied Croats and Narentines, protecting the interests of Venetian trading colonies. The aforementioned date marked the onset of Venetian extension in the Adriatic.

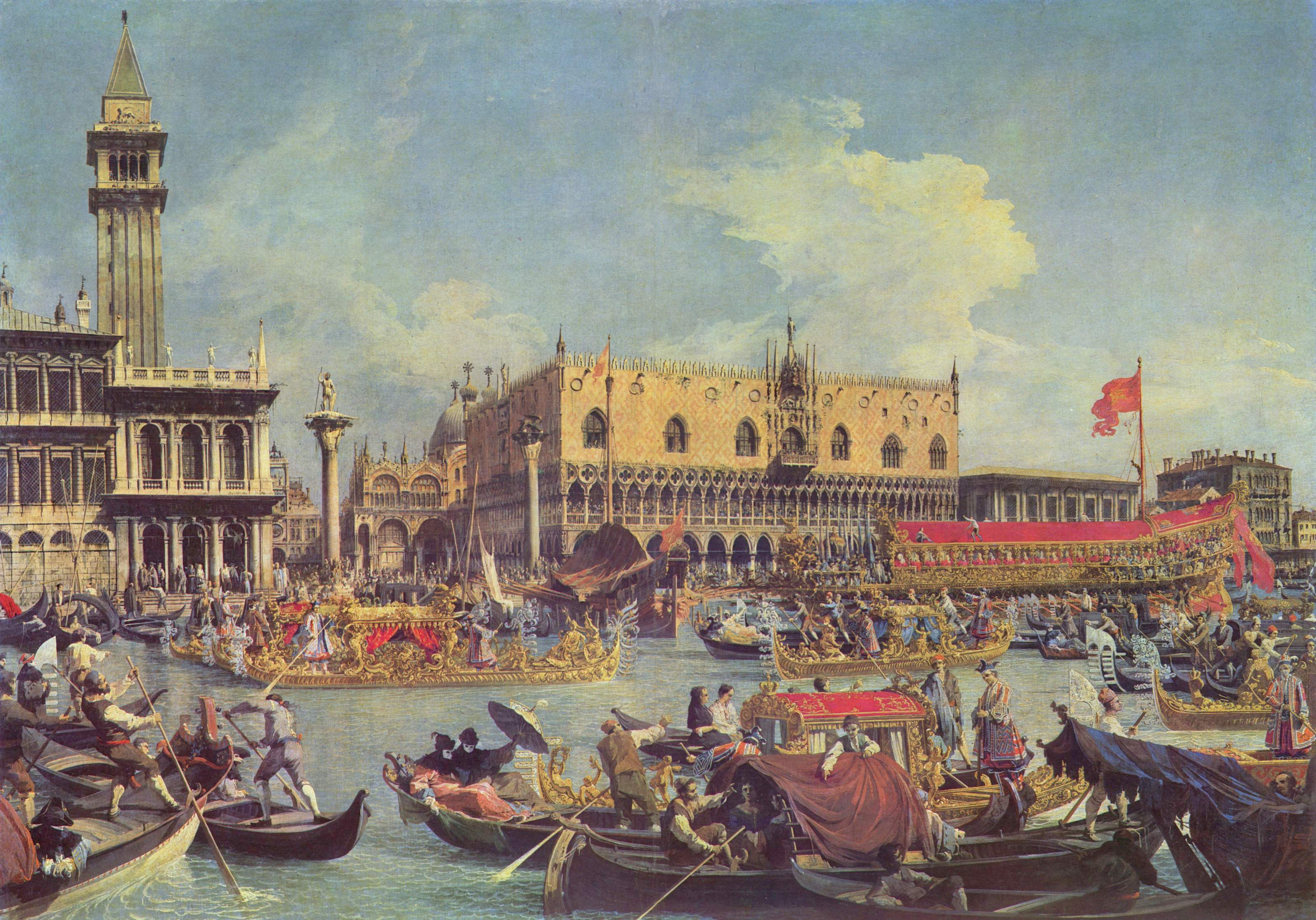
Il ritorno del Bucintoro nel Molo il giorno dell'Ascensione (The Return of the Bucentaur to the Molo on Ascension Day, 1730) by Canaletto (1697–1768). Another painting of the same subject by Canaletto, Il Bucintoro al molo nel giorno dell'Ascensione (The Bucentaur at the Molo on Ascension Day), was purchased for £11.43 million by a mystery bidder at a Christie's auction in London on 6 July 2005.

The second event commemorated took place in 1177 when the Doge Sebastiano Ziani, Pope Alexander III and the Holy Roman Emperor, Frederick Barbarossa agreed to the Treaty of Venice which ended the long-standing differences between the Pontificate and the Holy Roman Empire.

On the occasion of this festival was held the ceremony of the Marriage of the Sea (It. Sposalizio del Mare). This ceremony is recreated annually with the Mayor of Venice taking on the traditional role, which was historically executed by the Doge, by throwing a ring into the lagoon to symbolize Venice's marriage to the sea. The ceremony is preceded by a parade of boats and afterwards the festival contains a boat race, that starts the local racing season.
