= Rue Dauphine =

Street in Paris, France

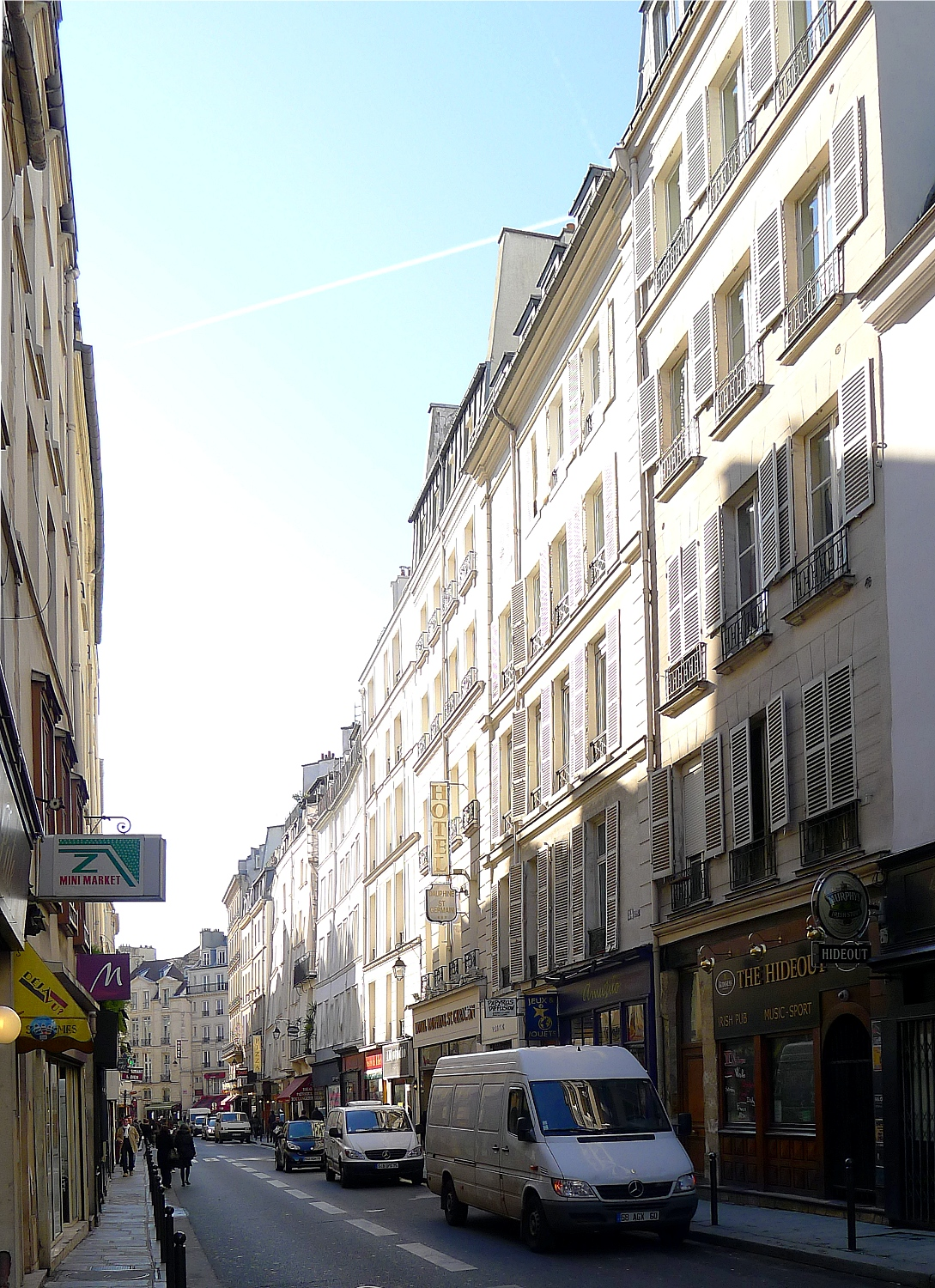

- Location within Paris
- Namesake: Louis, Dauphin of France
- Length: 268 m (879 ft)
- Width: 16 m (52 ft)
- Arrondissement: 6th
- Quarter: Monnaie
- Coordinates: 48°51′18″N 2°20′22″E
- From: 57 Quai des Grands Augustins and 1 Quai de Conti
- To: 72 Rue Saint-André-des-Arts and 51 Rue Mazarine

Construction
- Completion: 1607
- Denomination: 1607

The Rue Dauphine is a street in Saint-Germain-des-Prés in the 6th arrondissement of Paris, France. It is one of the most fashionable and expensive districts of Paris.

It was named after the Dauphin, son of Henry IV of France.

The Pont Neuf crosses the river Seine in front of the Rue Dauphine.

Nobel Prize–winning physicist Pierre Curie, husband of Marie Skłodowska-Curie, was struck and killed by a horse-drawn carriage on this street in 1906.

== Access ==
Located near the Metro station: Odéon.
