= The Bucentaur Returns to the Pier at the Doge's Palace =

Painting by Canaletto

The Bucentaur Returns to the Pier at the Doge's Palace (c. 1730) by Canaletto

The Bucentaur Returns to the Pier at the Doge's Palace or The Doge of Venice Departs for the Festival of the Betrothal of Venice to the Adriatic Sea is an oil-on-canvas painting executed c.1730 by the Italian painter Canaletto. It was acquired together with his Reception of the French Ambassador in Venice in the 1760s for the Hermitage Museum. In 1930 The Bucentaur was transferred to the Pushkin Museum in Moscow, where it remains. Variants of the work survive in several collections, including the Royal Collection at Windsor Castle, the Dulwich Picture Gallery and the Uffizi, whilst a copy by Fyodor Alekseyev is in the Russian Museum.

== See also ==
- List of works by Canaletto
