= Peace of Constance =

1183 privilege in the Holy Roman Empire

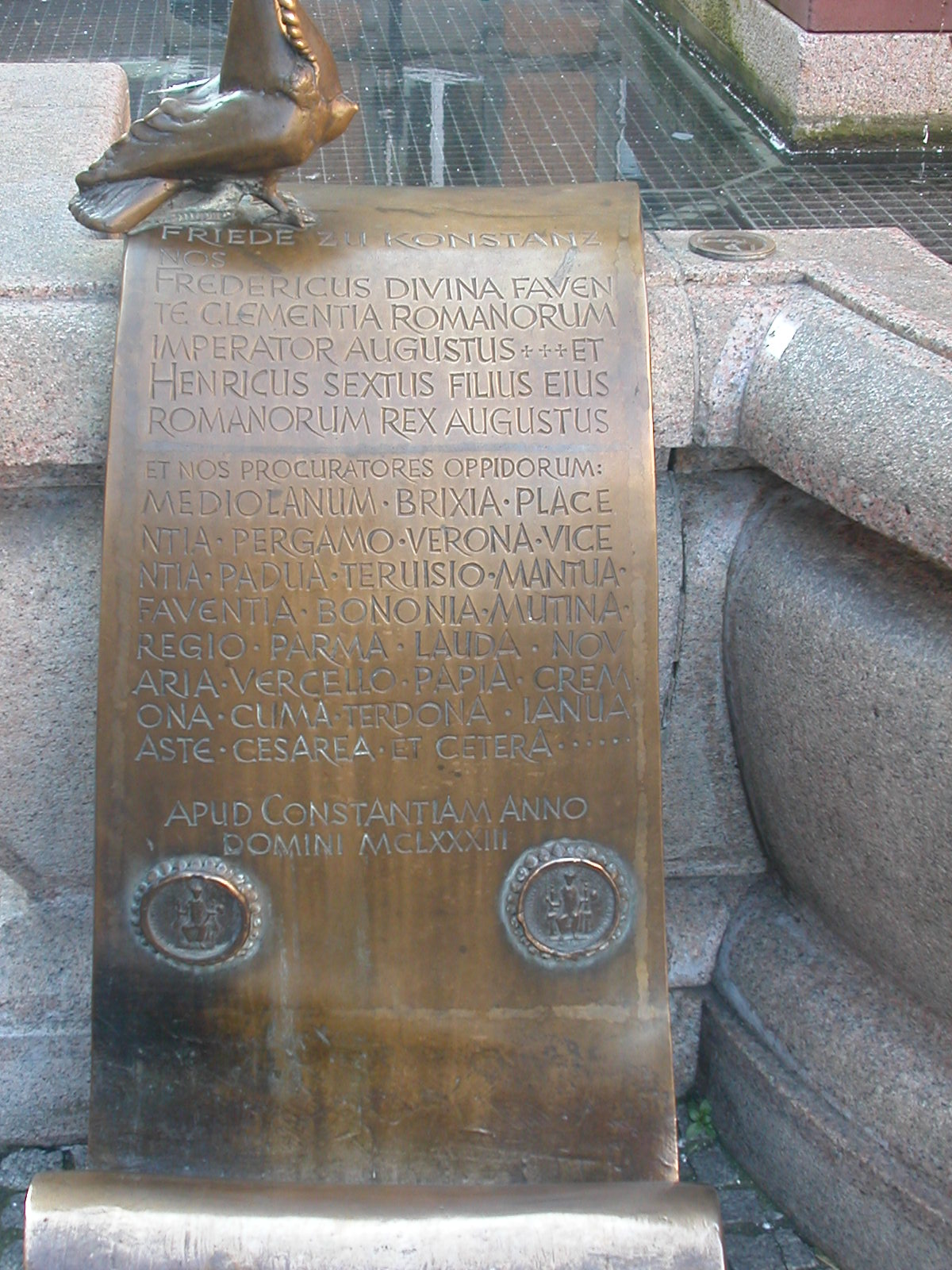
Bronze replica of the contract, Konstanz

The Peace of Constance (25 June 1183) was a privilege granted by Frederick I, Holy Roman Emperor, and his son and co-ruler, Henry VI, King of the Romans, to the members of the Lombard League to end the state of rebellion (war) that had been ongoing since 1167. It was a permanent peace that superseded the six-year truce imposed by the Treaty of Venice (22 July 1177).

With the expiration of the truce approaching, negotiations between the emperor and the league were begun in early 1183. There were proposals and counter-proposals, a separate settlement of the disputed status of Alessandria and a preliminary agreement signed at Piacenza. The treaty of Piacenza formed the basis for the final peace, which was issued as an imperial privilege because formally the emperor could not sign a treaty with his subjects.

== Terms ==
Giuseppe Bossi, The Peace of Constance, brush and ink on white paper, Sforza Castle, Milan

The agreement confirmed the 1177 Treaty of Venice. The cities in the Kingdom of Italy retained several regalia of local jurisdiction over their territories and had the freedom to elect their own councils and to enact their own legislation, as well as to keep their Lombard League alliance. On the other hand, they were required to swear an oath of fealty to the Holy Roman Emperor and their consuls had to be invested directly by him. Imperial judges had the prerogative to judge appeals and some districts in Italy were placed under direct Imperial administration. The cities also retained civil and criminal jurisdiction while the appellate jurisdiction was in the imperial hands. The consuls were only allowed to render final verdicts in crimes that involve sums of less than twenty-five pounds of gold. Furthermore, the Italian municipalities agreed to pay the Empire an annual sum of 2,000 lire as taxes.

A commentary about the agreement by Baldo degli Ubaldi published in his Commentaria in usus feudorum identified the capability attributed to the emperor to break aspects of it because his oath was considered temporary. However, there was no attempt to infringe the conditions of the compact on the part of the crown during the 67-year reign of the house of Hohenstaufen.

The cities stopped fulfilling their obligations during the long struggle for the Imperial crown that followed the death of Frederick's son Emperor Henry VI in 1197, and the Peace of Constance was at the centre of the new conflict fought between the so-called second Lombard League and Emperor Frederick II between 1226 and 1250. It was celebrated for the rest of the Middle Ages and beyond as the only Imperial recognition of the autonomy of a large group of Italian cities.

== Text ==
- Latin text of the Peace of Constance in MGH, Diplomata, X.iv (Hanover, 1990), pp. 71–77
- Partial English translation by Frances Andrews in Katherine L. Jansen, Joanna Drell and Frances Andrews (eds.), Medieval Italy: Texts in Translation (University of Pennsylvania Press, 2009), pp. 61–63. JSTOR j.ctt3fhhzb.22 doi:10.9783/9780812206067.61
- Italian Translation from the University of Verona

In the name of the holy and undivided Trinity Frederick, by divine grace Emperor of the Romans, Augustus, and Henry VI his son, King of the Romans, Augustus, is accustomed to show grace and favor and make dispensations to subjects, with imperial clemency and mild serenity . . . however much he must and can correct the excesses of transgressions with severity, yet more he studies to rule the Roman empire in gracious peace and tranquility and . . . bring the insolence of rebels back to due loyalty and devotion. . . . Therefore let all the faithful of the empire, both in the present time and in future, know that we, with our customary generosity . . .receive the League of the Lombards and their supporters, who once offended us and our empire, into the fullness of our grace . . . and we mercifully grant them our peace, ordering that the present page be undersigned and secured with our seal. Of which this is the tenor:

1. We, Frederick, Emperor of the Romans, and our son Henry, king of the Romans, grant in perpetuity to you, the cities, places, and persons of the League, the regalia and other customs both inside and outside the cities—that is Verona and its castrum and suburbs and the other cities, places and persons of the League—, so that in these cities you will hold everything as you have been accustomed until now and shall exercise without contradiction those customs which you have exercised of old . . . that is, concerning the fodrum, woods, pastures, bridges, water, and mills, and, as you have had of old and have, over armies, defense of the cities [and] jurisdiction over both criminal cases and those concerning money both inside and out, and in those other things which concern the benefit of the cities.

2. We wish that the regalia that are not granted to you shall be recognized in the following manner: the bishop of the place and men of both the city and the diocese shall choose men of good repute, believed to be suitable for this, and such as hold no special, private hatred against either the city or our majesty. They shall swear to inquire without fraud and, having inquired, to consign to our excellence those [regalia] which belong to us.

3. If, however, they shall consider this inquest best avoided, we request that they shall pay to us an annual payment of 2,000 marks in silver. If nevertheless, this sum shall seem excessive, it may be reduced by an appropriate amount. . . .

4. If someone will have presented to our Majesty an appeal, and that concern both the city and the extra-urban territory. we will reject the appeal and impose a perpetual silence.

5. What We, or one of our predecessors, king or emperor, gave or granted in any way to bishops, churches, cities or any other person, cleric or lay, before the war, We shall consider valid and approve it, without prejudice to previous concessions. And in return for this, they shall render to Us the customary military services, but no census shall be paid.

6. We do not believe that the economic advantages, both within the urban perimeter and outside, and for the sake of peace we have granted to the cities, and for which a census must be paid, are to be understood under the name of gifts.

7. All privileges granted by us, or our messengers during the war, which prejudice or damage the cities, places or persons of the League, shall be void.

8. In those cities in which the bishop by imperial or royal privilege holds the county [as lord], if the consuls are accustomed to receive the consulate through the bishop, let them receive it from him: otherwise, let each city receive the consulate from us. Consequently, just as in each city the consuls shall be constituted by our messenger, those who are in the city or diocese shall receive investiture for up to five years. At the end of the five years, each city shall send a messenger to our presence to receive investiture and again in future, on finishing each five-year period, they shall receive investiture from us and in between from our messenger . . . unless we shall be in Lombardy, in which case they shall receive it from us. . . .

9. Should we, emperor, by divine call die or leave the kingdom to our son, you will receive the investiture equally from our son or his successor.

10. In appeal cases the appeal shall be presented to Us if the sum of 25 imperial lira is exceeded, without prejudice to the law and customs of the Church of Brescia in appeals; However, it shall not be obligatory to go to Germany, but We shall keep a representative in the city or in the territory of the episcopate who will instruct the appeal case and swear in good faith that he will examine the cases and pronounce judgment according to the laws and customs of the city within two months of the appeal or of receiving the appeal, unless there is a just impediment or the consent of both parties.

11. The consuls who are elected in the cities, before receiving consulship, shall take an oath of allegiance to Us.

12. Our vassals shall receive the investiture from Us and shall take the oath as vassals; all others, from fifteen years to seventy years, shall swear allegiance as citizens, unless they are persons to whom the oath can and should be condoned, without fraud.

13. Vassals who during the war or the period of truce did not request investiture or did not provide us with the necessary military services, for this reason do not lose their fiefdom.

14. Contracts of level or precarious maintain their value according to the custom of each city, despite our legislative provision, which is said to be of the Emperor Frederick

15. All damages, losses, and injuries which we or our followers have sustained from the League or any of its members or supporters, are hereby pardoned by us and we give them the plenitude of our grace.

16. We will not stay longer than is necessary in any city or bishopric to the damage of the city.

17. Cities shall be allowed to fortify and to erect fortifications.

18. That League they now have may continue and may be renewed as often as they wish. . . .

19. The pacts stipulated for fear of our Majesty, or extorted with violence by our representatives, are annulled, nor for them anything is required; for example the pact of the Piacentini for the bridge over the Po and the tenancy of the same bridge and the gifts, the concession and the pact that Bishop Ugo made of Castell'Arquato, and if other similar agreements were made by the same bishop or by the Municipality or by others of the League with us or with our representative; the bridge, with all its income will remain with the Piacentini and they will always be required to pay the rent to the abbess of Santa Giulia of Brescia; and other similar agreements are added.

20. We consider valid the sentences that have been pronounced according to law and according to the laws and customs against one or more members of the League, if by right they are valid against them, even if they have received our forgiveness. Those sentences which have been pronounced against the members of the League because of war and discord or conflict with the Church shall be annulled.

21. The possessions that each member of the League had legitimately before the war, if they have been forcibly taken away by those who do not belong to the same League, shall be returned without fruits and without payment of damages; or they shall be kept peacefully by the former owners, if they had recovered them, unless they are assigned to Us because they are recognized as royal rights by elected arbitrators.

22. We have received in the fullness of our forgiveness and have forgiven every offence, We and our party, with imperial clemency, to Marquis Opizone. He insulted us and our allies after joining the League, either by fighting personally, or through an intermediary, with the cities of Lombardy, or by defending some of them. We will not cause him or his party any harm or imposition, either directly or through an intermediary, because of past offences.

23. In addition, without our opposition and that of our successors, the Milanese have and possess freely and peacefully the jurisdiction which they used to exercise and which they now exercise in the committees of Seprio, Marciana and Bulgaria and in other committees, with the exception of the places which the Bergamasks now hold undividedly between the Adda and the Oglio, except for Romano Vecchio and Bariano, without prejudice to and maintaining in force the pacts, donations and concessions which the Milanese in common made to the cities of Bergamo, Novara and Lodi; and for this concession those pacts must not be damaged.

24. Because of these concessions, no rights are acquired to the detriment of any city of the League, nor any of them see its rights and customs damaged.

25. The agreements once signed between the cities of the League remain in force and are valid.

26. Neither because of these concessions is it thought that something has been acquired by the Milanese in the episcopate of Lodi, except the right of Milan on the waters of the Lambro, if it owns it, and except the right on the toll.

27. All those of the League who shall swear fealty to us, shall add to the oath of fealty that they will help us in good faith to maintain possessions and rights which we have in Lombardy outside the League, if it shall be expedient and if they shall be requested to do so by us or our messenger. . . .

28. If one of the cities has not observed the covenants which in this peace agreement have been established by Us, the others in good faith will oblige it to respect them and the peace will continue to be valid.

29. All those who are accustomed to give and who must give (when they are accustomed to do so and must do so) the usual royal sheath to Us, when we come down to Lombardy, will be obliged to pay it. They will repair the roads and bridges in good faith and without fraud, as well as in an acceptable way, both on the outward and the return journey. They will provide Us and our followers, on the way there and back, with the possibility of a sufficient supply of food and this in good faith and without fraud.

30. If we so request, either directly or through our representative, the Cities shall renew their oaths of allegiance for those things which they have not done to us.

31. If some people, belonging to our party, have been expelled from their legitimate possessions, these are returned to them without the payment of interest and damage caused, unless the owner defends himself by showing the right of ownership or claiming to be the main owner, without prejudice to all previous concessions. Finally, all offences are forgiven to them. We will take care to safeguard the same right, relative to restitution, towards those who belong to our party, unless the city is obliged by an oath of non-return, in which case we want the possibility of retrocession to be decided by arbitration of probative men.

41. These are the places and cities that received with Us, after the oath of the Lombards, the aforementioned Peace and they swore to observe it: Pavia, Cremona, Como, Tortona, Asti, Cesarea (Alessandria), Genoa, Alba, and other cities, places and people that belonged and belonged to our party.

42. These are the names of the representatives who received from us, on behalf of the cities, the investiture of the consulate: from Milan, Adobato; from Piacenza, Gerardo Ardizzoni; from Lodi Vincenzo; from Verona, Cozio; from Vicenza, Pilio; from Padova Gnaffo; from Treviso, Florio; from Mantova, Alessandrino; from Faenza, Bernardo; from Bologna, Antonino; from Modena, Arlotto; from Reggio, Rolando; from Parma, Giacomo di Pietro Bave; from Novara, Opizzo; from Vercelli Medardo; from Bergamo, Attone Ficiano.

== Sources ==
- Freed, John (2016). Frederick Barbarossa: The Prince and the Myth. New Haven, CT: Yale University Press. ISBN 978-0-300-122763.
- Raccagni, Gianluca (2008). "Il diritto pubblico, la pace di costanza e i «libri iurium» dei comuni lombardi". In D. Quaglioni; G. Dilcher (eds.). Gli inizi del diritto pubblico, 2: Da Federico I a Federico II. Bologna–Berlin. pp. 309–340. Archived from the original on 2014-02-02.
- Raccagni, Gianluca (2010). The Lombard League, 1164–1225. Oxford University Press.
- Raccagni, Gianluca (2013). "The Teaching of Rhetoric and the Magna Carta of the Lombard Cities: The Peace of Constance, the Empire and the Papacy in the Works of Guido Faba and His Leading Contemporary Colleagues". Journal of Medieval History. 39 (1): 61–79. doi:10.1080/03044181.2012.745446. S2CID 153591955.
- Raccagni, Gianluca (2016). "When the Emperor Submitted to his Rebellious Subjects: A Neglected and Innovative Legal Account of the Peace of Constance, 1183" (PDF). The English Historical Review. 131 (550): 519–539. doi:10.1093/ehr/cew173.
