= Marriage of the Sea ceremony =

Ceremony performed in the Republic of Venice

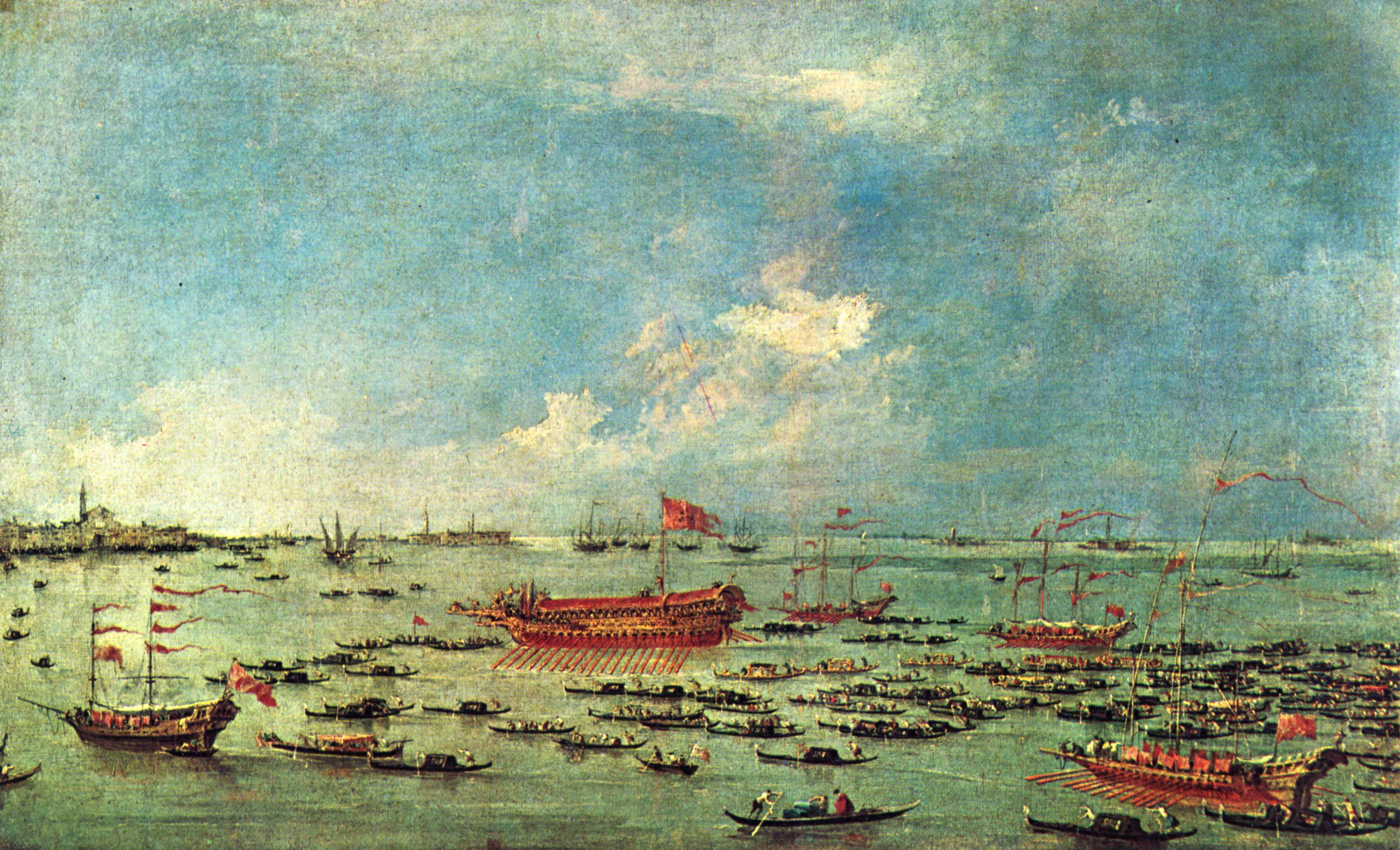
The Bucentaur near San Nicolò di Lido by Francesco Guardi

The Marriage of the Sea ceremony (Italian: Sposalizio del Mare) was a major maritime event in the Republic of Venice commemorated on Ascension Day. It symbolized the maritime dominion of Venice and was manifested by the throwing of a golden ring into the Adriatic Sea. This ritual gesture was performed by the doge of Venice until the fall of the republic in 1797.

Since 1965, the ceremony has been reenacted annually by the mayor of Venice reprising the role as doge.

== Origins ==
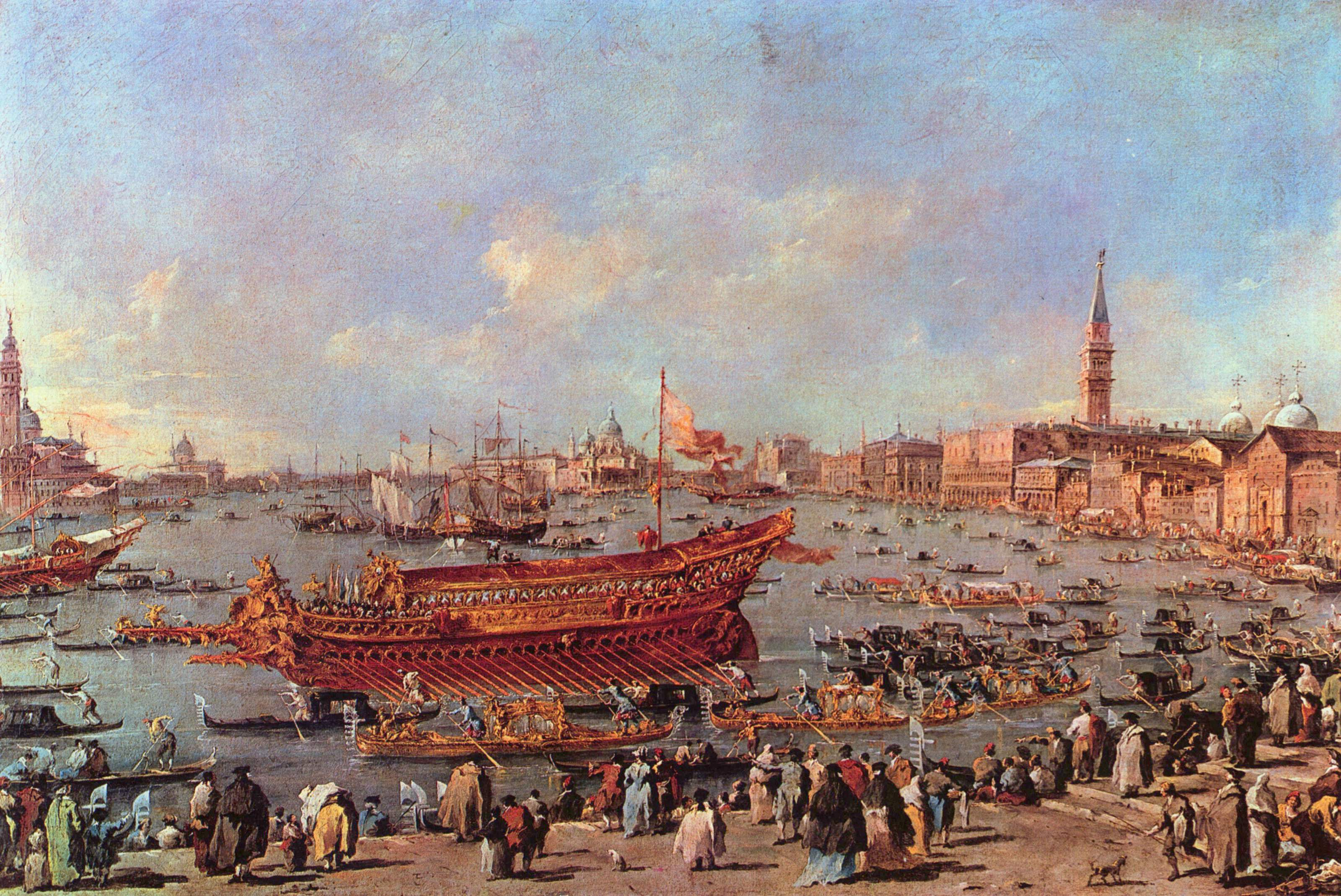
The Departure of Bucentaur for the Lido on Ascension Day by Francesco Guardi

The rites of propitiation linked to the sea dates back to antiquity. In his short memoir, the French archaeologist and religious historian Salomon Reinach recalls famous episodes, in particular the throwing by Polycrates, tyrant of Samos, of a precious ring into the sea to appease the gods. He also quotes Empress Helena throwing a nail from the True Cross into the Adriatic Sea to make it more lenient to navigators. According to Reinach, the Marriage of the Sea ceremony of the Venetians was derived from a pagan ritual reappropriated by the Catholic Church.

According to most authors, the ceremony first appeared around the year 1000, concurrent to the conquest of Dalmatia by the Venetians around 997 under the leadership of Doge Pietro II Orseolo.

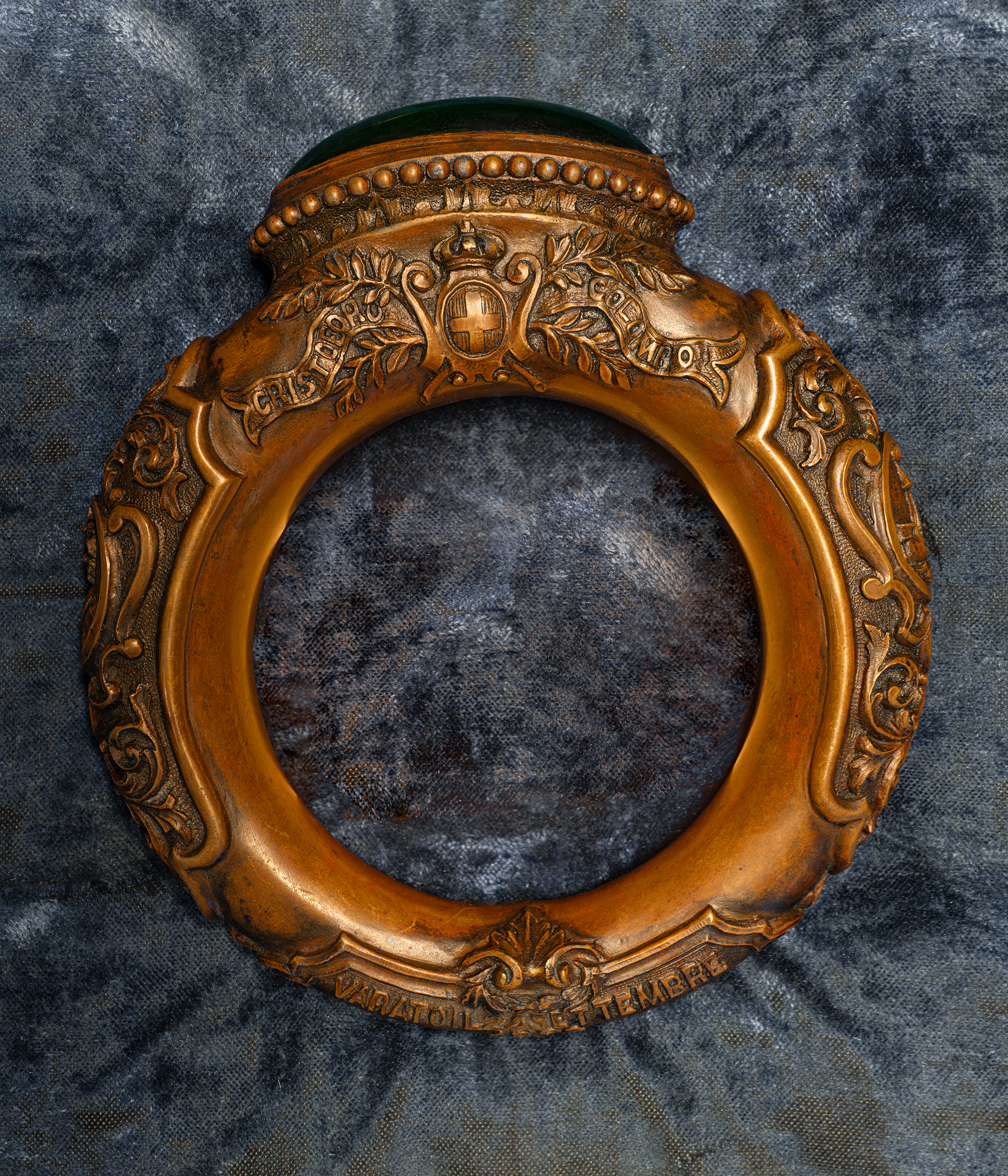
Launching ring for corvette Cristoforo Colombo (1892). Marriage of the Sea ceremony (Sposalizio del Mare). Naval History Museum, Venice

The event was definitively codified and fixed on Ascension Day in 1173 under the reign of Doge Sebastian Ziani. Its principle was confirmed in 1176 by Pope Alexander III who, during the truce in Venice, gave Doge Sebastiano Ziani a gold ring, saying to him: "Here, my son, Doge of Venice, this is the wedding ring of your marriage to the sea. From now on, we want you and your successors to marry her every year". The ceremony would be commemorated for more than six centuries until the entry of Napoleon's troops and the abdication of Doge Ludovico Manin during the fall of the Republic of Venice in 1797.

The major symbolic importance of this Venetian ceremony is regularly underlined. According to Italian art historian Sergio Bettini, the event is "something deeper and more substantial [...] than a simple occasion of rest or jubilation or commemoration". Like the "great Roman and Byzantine ceremonies", it is "the periodic representation and incarnation of the myth of Venice in real life". The United Nations Educational, Scientific and Cultural Organization (UNESCO) evokes the ceremony as a "fundamental" rite for ancient Venice.

== Procedure ==
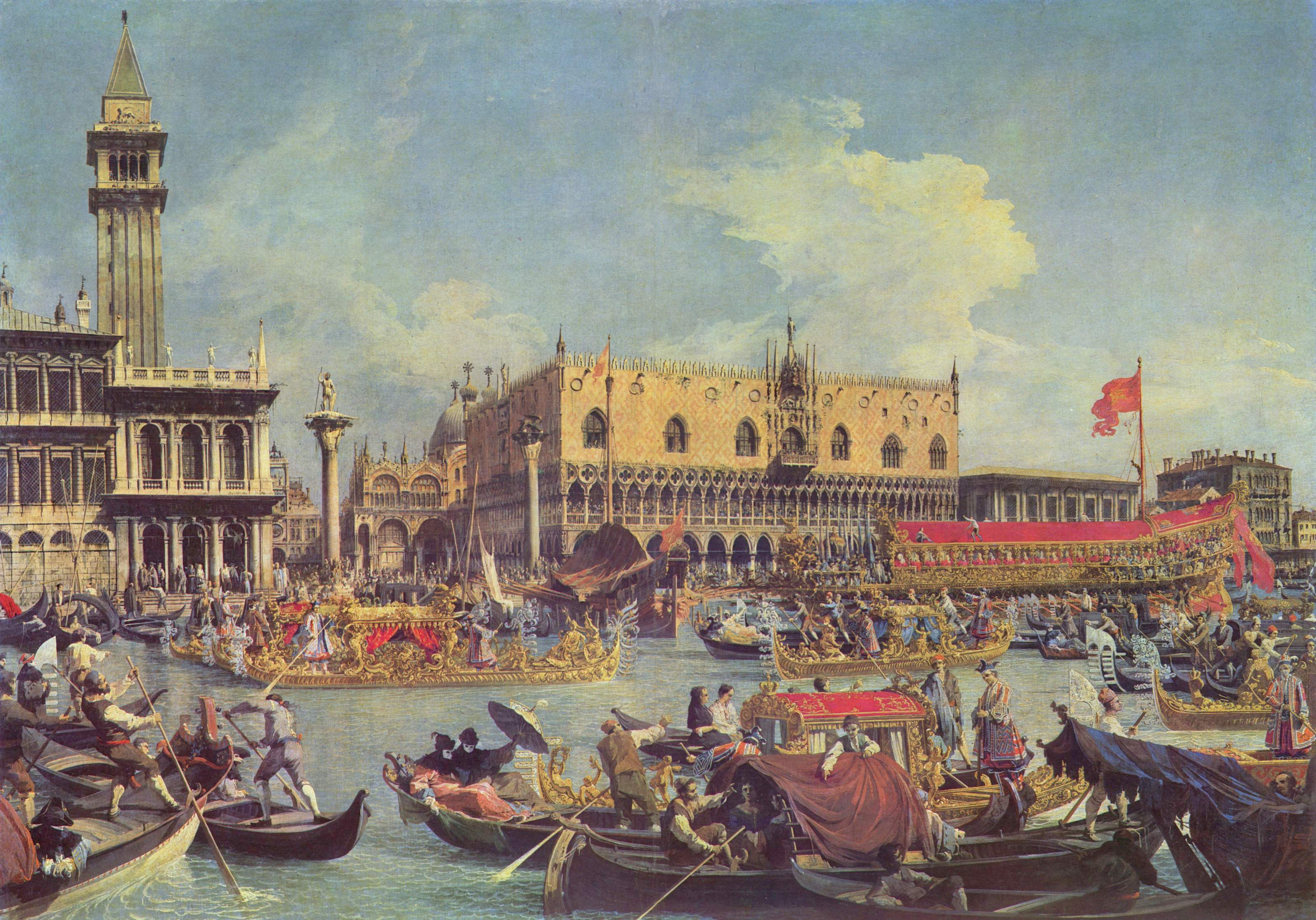
The Return of the Bucentaur to the Molo on Ascension Day by Canaletto

The ceremony begins with the bucentaur docking at the Môle in front of the Doge's Palace. The doge of Venice boards the sovereign galley dressed in full regalia: a mantle of gold and silver lamé brocade made with ermine fur, with a ceremonial corno ducale headwear and command rod in hand. He takes his seat at the stern, with the papal legate on his right and the French ambassador on his left. The Venetian Senate occupies four rows of seats.

The bucentaur leaves the lagoon and heads for the Adriatic Sea surrounded by accompanying boats and gondolas. Once it is off the barrier island of Lido di Venezia, the Patriarch of Venice climbs aboard from another ship and heads to the stern. The Patriarch then pronounces a nuptial benediction (marriage) which consecrates the ceremony. The doge then throws the ring into the sea while reciting the following address translated as: "We espouse thee, O sea, as a sign of true and perpetual dominion".

Desponsamus te, mare, in signum veri perpetuique dominii.

— Address by the Doge

The return of the bucentaur to shore signals the opening of the Festa della Sensa, a feast famous throughout Europe for its splendor and wealth, and its huge fair in Saint Mark's Square.

A Grand Admiral was responsible for passenger safety during the journey. The bucentaur was not well-suited for navigation, difficult to maneuver, and had a flat bottom and shallow draft which risked it capsizing. The author Giacomo Casanova noted that the slightest headwind could "drown the doge with all the most serene lordship, the ambassadors and the nuncio of the pope", and that an accident would cause Europe to laugh and say "the doge of Venice finally went to consummate his marriage".

== Present day ==
Since 1965, modern-day Venice has reenacted the ceremony on Ascension Day every year with the mayor of Venice reprising the role as doge. The mayor is accompanied by the patriarch of Venice and other dignitaries as they travel to San Nicolò Church on a replica of the bucentaur, where a ring is ceremoniously thrown into the sea.

The only contemporary evidence of the ancient ritual which is currently preserved is the ring of an unidentified doge fished out of the sea by chance. It is now part of the collection in Saint Mark's Basilica.

== See also ==
- Festa della Sensa
- Poland's Wedding to the Sea
- Marriage of the Sea ceremony (Cervia)
- Marriage of the Sea ceremony (Pisa)
