= Treaty of Venice =

1177 peace treaty between the Lombard League and Holy Roman Empire

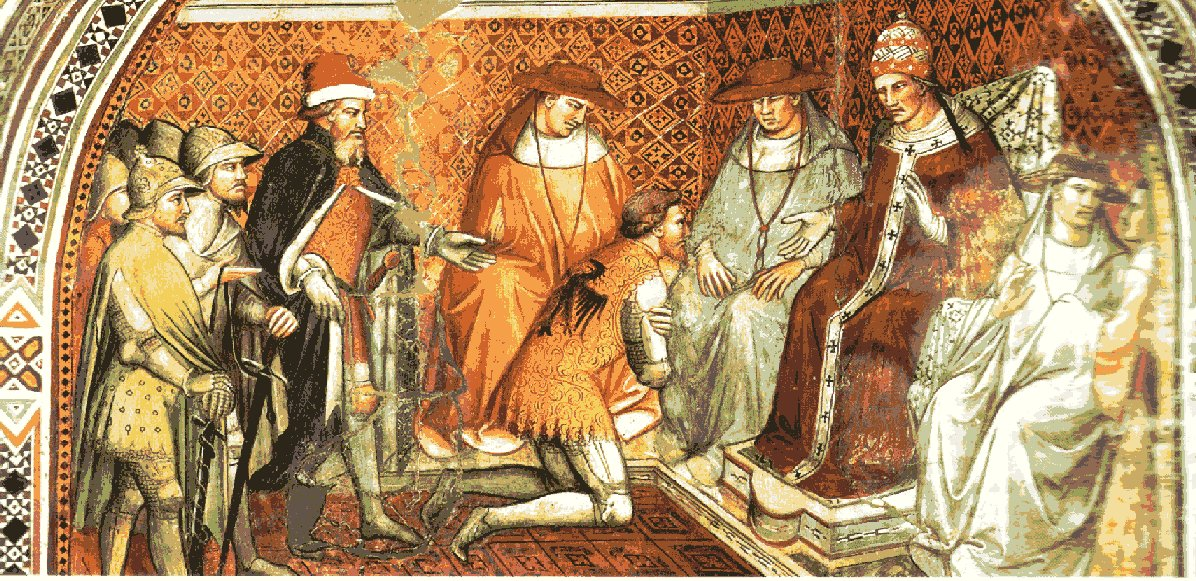
Fresco in Palazzo Pubblico, Siena depicting the submission of the emperor to the Pope

The Treaty or Peace of Venice, 1177, was a peace treaty between the papacy and its allies, the north Italian city-states of the Lombard League, and Frederick I ”Barbarossa,” Holy Roman Emperor. The Norman Kingdom of Sicily also took part in negotiations and the treaty thereby determined the political course of all Italy for the next several years.

The treaty followed on the heels of the Battle of Legnano of 29 May 1176, a defeat for Frederick, who quickly thereafter sent envoys to Pope Alexander III at Anagni, asking for an end to the schism between him and Frederick's antipope, Callixtus III. After a preliminary agreement was reached, a conference was scheduled for July 1177. Frederick spent some time in the interim interfering in Venetian rivalries in hopes of securing a pro-Imperial group in power at the time of the confrontation.

On 24 July, the pope from the Basilica di San Marco sent a delegation of cardinals to the emperor in the Lido, at the mouth of the Venetian Lagoon. The emperor formally acknowledged Alexander as pope and abandoned his own antipope; the cardinals formally lifted the excommunication that had hitherto been placed upon him. Sebastian Ziani, the doge of Venice, and Ulrich II von Treven, the patriarch of Aquileia, then escorted the emperor into Venice itself. The delegates of the king of Sicily were Romuald II, Archbishop of Salerno, a chronicler who left an eyewitness account of the scene, and Count Roger of Andria.

After the treaty, Beatrice I, Countess of Burgundy wife of Frederick was no longer referred to as Imperatrix ('empress') in the chancery productions, as her coronation as such had been made by an anti-pope and was thus declared nullified. The treaty also claimed that if Frederick died and was succeeded by a young emperor, then Beatrice, as the queen dowager regent, should still observe it. (Such event never occurred, as Beatrice predeceased Frederick.)

In the treaty that was concluded, the rights of the emperor and the pope in the city of Rome and in the Patrimony of St. Peter were left vague. A clause in the preliminary agreement of Anagni referring to the pope's regalia in Rome was dropped in the final treaty and papal rights of possession including the Prefecture of the City of Rome, were recognized but "saving all the rights of the empire". The city did not surrender to the pope and forced him to leave in 1179.

A fifteen-year peace was concluded between Frederick and William II of Sicily, paving the way for Sicily's golden years of peace and prosperity. Likewise, a six-year truce was concluded with the Lombard League, but negotiations were to continue, and the emperor finally recognised the independence of the Lombard cities in the Peace of Constance of 1183.

== See also ==
- List of treaties

== Sources ==
- The treaty itself: text at Yale Law School and the Internet Medieval Sourcebook.
- Norwich, John Julius. The Kingdom in the Sun 1130-1194. Longman: London, 1970.
