= Marcello Tegalliano =

Doge of Venice from 717 to 726

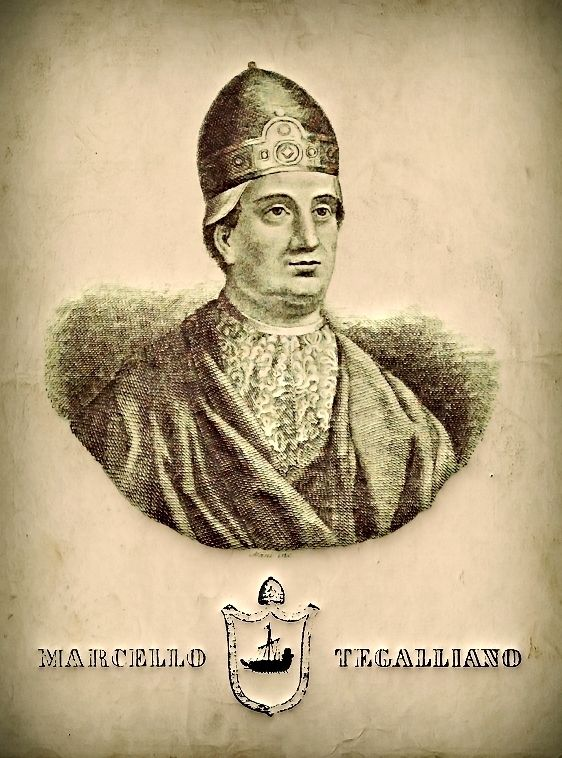
- Late artistic representation of Marcello Tegalliano

2nd (traditionally) Doge of Venice
- In office 717 – 726 (traditionally)
- Preceded by: Paolo Lucio Anafesto
- Succeeded by: Orso Ipato

Personal details
- Born: Unknown
- Died: 726

Marcello Tegalliano (Latin: Marcellus Tegalianus) was, according to Venetian chronicler John the Deacon and some other, much later sources and traditions, the second Doge of Venice, serving (allegedly) from 717 to 726. Since he is not known as such from contemporary sources, modern scholars have raised various questions regarding his personal (prosopographical) historicity and reliability of later accounts, provided by John the Deacon, who died sometime after 1018.

== Traditional accounts ==
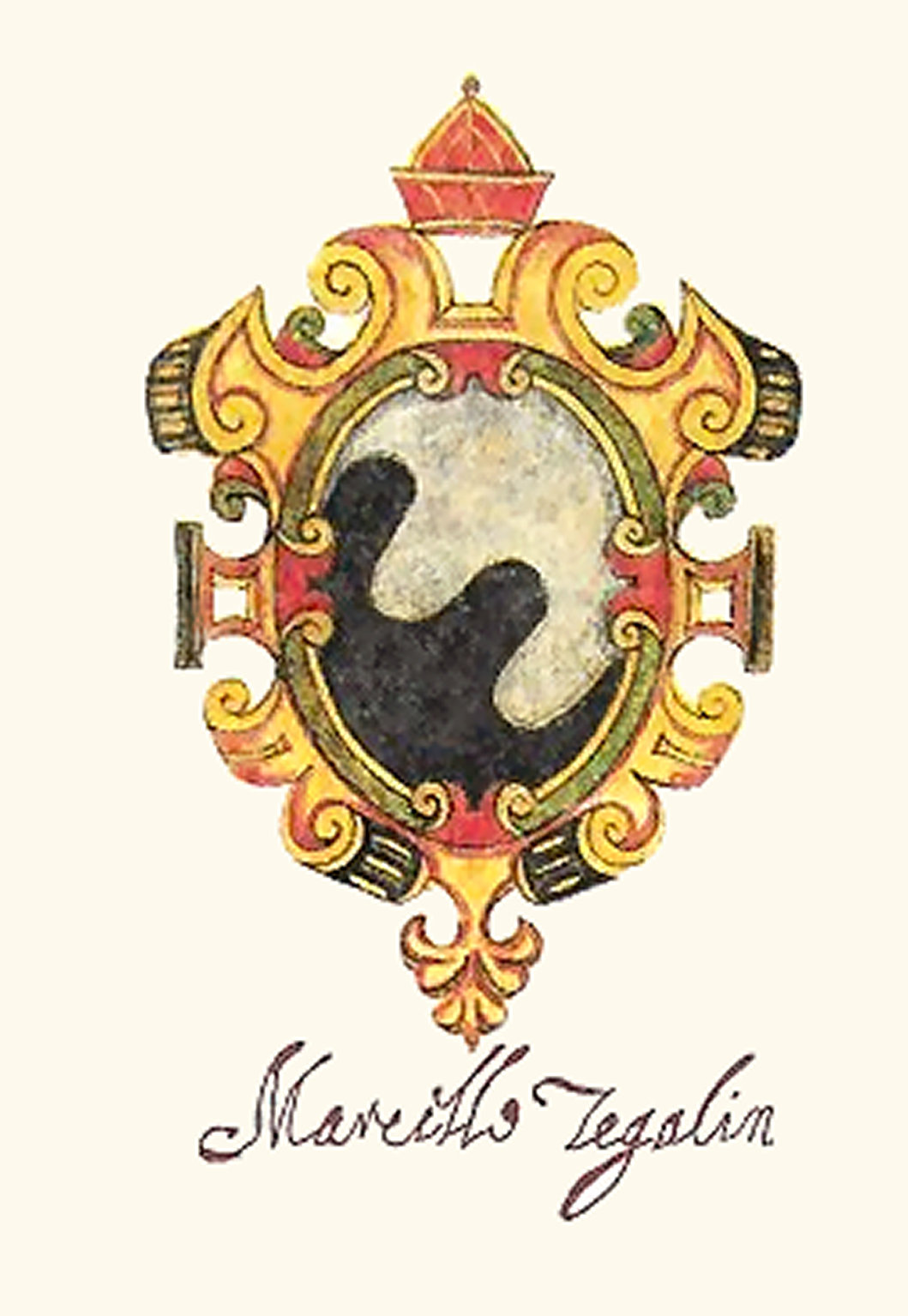
Supposed coat of arms of Marcello Tegalliano

Traditional accounts on this person being the second Doge of Venice are based primarily on John the Deacon's work, known as Chronicon Venetum et Gradense, written at the beginning of the 11th century, and also on some other, much later narrative sources and traditions. According to such sources, Marcello was a nobleman from Eraclea, then the main town in the region. He was elected in 717 as the second duke (doge), and successor of Paoluccio Anafesto, with jurisdiction over the Venetian lagoon. During the entire reign, he was apparently in disagreement with the nearby Longobards. He also repelled an attack from the Umayyads. He died in 726 and was succeeded by Orso Ipato. Later chroniclers, Nicolò Trevisan and Andrea Dandolo, recorded Marcello's surname as Tegalliano. According to Dandolo, Marcello was interred, like his predecessor, in Eraclea. The aforementioned Trevisan and Dandolo, on the basis of the assonance with name and surname, identified Marcello as the progenitor of the Marcello and Fonicalli families.

== Historical criticism ==
Validity of accounts provided by John the Deacon and later chroniclers was analyzed by various scholars, particularly in the light of a well known source called the Pactum Lotharii, stipulated in 840 between the emperor Lothair I and the doge Pietro Tradonico. That document mentions an earlier agreement (Terminatio Liutprandina) on the delimitation of the borders around Cittanova concluded under the Lombard king Liutprand (712–744), between certain duke Paoluccio and the magister militum Marcello. The Pactum Lotharii was repeatedly confirmed in the following centuries and was therefore well known to John the Deacon, the first known Venetian chronicler who, around the year 1000, identified Paoluccio and Marcello respectively as the first and second doges of Venice.

These conclusions were then adopted by subsequent chroniclers and historians, up to the modern era, when some scholars questioned the historicity of Paoluccio and Marcello as doges. For Roberto Cessi the first doge was Orso, directly elected by the Venetians in 726 during a revolt against the government of the Byzantine emperor Leo III the Isaurian. Thus, it was proposed that Paoluccio should be identified with imperial exarch Paul of Ravenna, while magister militum Marcello would be a governor of the Byzantine Venetia. Various scholars have accepted Marcellus as magister militum of Byzantine Venetia, while regarding Paoluccio, some have proposed solutions based on him not being an Exarch of Ravenna, but rather one of the neighboring Lombard dukes who had a similar name.

Some disputes between the patriarch of Grado and the patriarch of Aquileia were also attributed to the time of Marcello's alleged rule. In 723, Pope Gregory II sent a letter to the bishops of the ecclesiastical province of Venice and Istria in which he reprimanded Sereno of Aquileia about respecting the rights of Donato of Grado. The text is handed down to us in full by Andrea Dandolo, however, many historians raised doubts about the veracity of the letter. Among the recipients there is also the magister militum Marcello, accompanied by the title of duke. However, the latter is considered a forgery designed to give greater credence to local traditions.

== See also ==
- Byzantine Venetia

== Sources ==
- Cosentino, Salvatore, ed. (2021). A Companion to Byzantine Italy. Boston-Leiden: Brill.
- Gasparri, Stefano (2018). "The First Dukes and the Origins of Venice". Venice and Its Neighbors from the 8th to 11th Century: Through Renovation and Continuity. Leiden-Boston: Brill. pp. 5–26.
- Norwich, John J. (1982). A History of Venice. New York: Knopf.
- Pazienza, Annamaria (2018). "Archival Documents as Narrative: The Sources of the Istoria Veneticorum and the Plea of Rižana". Venice and Its Neighbors from the 8th to 11th Century: Through Renovation and Continuity. Leiden-Boston: Brill. pp. 27–50.
- Skoblar, Magdalena, ed. (2021). Byzantium, Venice and the Medieval Adriatic: Spheres of Maritime Power and Influence, c. 700-1453. Cambridge: Cambridge University Press.

Political offices
| Preceded by Paolo Lucio Anafesto | Doge of Venice; 717–726 | Succeeded by Orso Ipato |
