= Battle of Brenta =

899 battle

Battle of the Brenta river
- Part of the Hungarian invasions of Europe
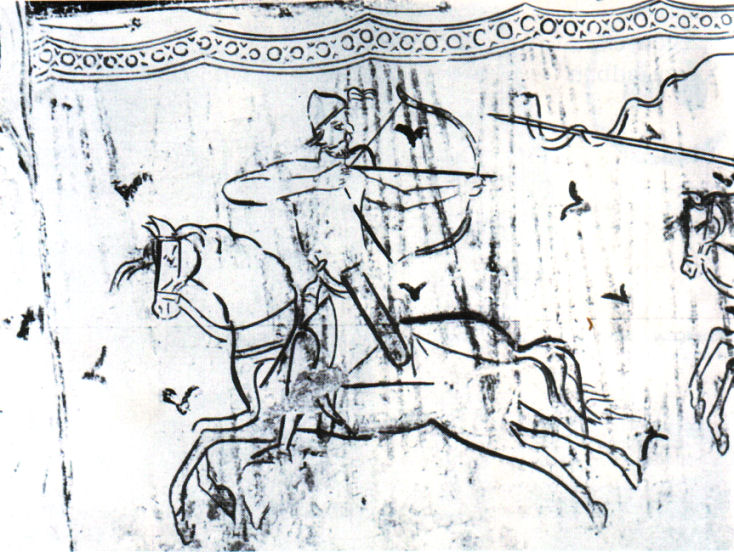
- Hungarian warrior (10th century) from Patriarchate of Aquileia (fresco)
Date	24 September 899
Location	Bank of the Brenta River, Italy
Result	Hungarian victory

Belligerents
Kingdom of Italy	Principality of Hungary

Commanders and leaders
Berengar I	Unknown Hungarian Commander

Strength
15,000	5,000

Casualties and losses
Almost all the Italian army	Minor

The Battle of Brenta was fought between the cavalry of the Kingdom of Italy under King Berengar I, and the Hungarians hired by the East Francian king Arnulf of Carinthia, at an unidentified location in northern Italian Peninsula along the river Brenta on 24 September 899. It was one of the earliest battles of the Hungarian invasions of Europe. The result was a crushing defeat for Berengar I, allowing the Magyars (Hungarians) to continue west and sack large areas of Italy. The Hungarian invaders burned many cities, including Feltre, Vercelli, Modena, and monasteries like the monastery in Nonantola.

Arnulf of Carinthia died in December 899. As a result, the Hungarians, whom he had hired against the Italian king, left the kingdom the following year with all their plunder, but not before concluding peace with Berengar, who gave them many hostages and gifts. On their way home, the Hungarians attempted an improvised amphibious assault of Venice across the Adriatic Sea, a unique achievement for an exclusively land army in pre-modern times, succeeding in sacking some outlying portions of Venice, only to be repulsed with significant casualties by Venetian ships.

In some historians' opinion the returning army had a role also in the conquest of Pannonia, as part of the Hungarian conquest of the Carpathian Basin from the Bavarians in late 900.

== Sources ==
Many contemporary sources mention this battle, including the Chronicon of Regino of Prüm, the Annales Fuldenses, the Chronicon Sagornini of John the Deacon, Catalogus abbatum nonantulorum, etc. The most important source is Antapodosis, seu rerum per Europam gestarum, written by Liutprand of Cremona, which gives the most detailed description of the battle and the events which led to it.

== Background ==
At the end of the 9th century the Carolingian Empire of Charlemagne had been divided into the kingdoms of West Francia, East Francia, and Italy, led by Carolingian kings who often fought for supremacy. Arnulf of Carinthia, the son of the East Francian king Carloman, who became German king in 887, wanted to recreate the Carolingian Empire and so undertook an Italian campaign, claiming the title King of Italy in 894. In 896 he was crowned as Holy Roman Emperor in Rome by the pope. His most important ally in Italy was Berengar of Friuli, who was himself a great-grandson of Charlemagne. After 898, however, Berengar began to consider himself more worthy for the title of emperor, believing himself to be a truer Carolingian than Arnulf, since the latter was an illegitimate son of Carloman.

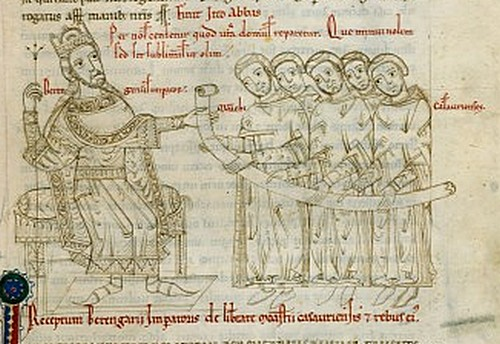
Berengar portrayed as king in a twelfth-century manuscript

Berengar had become king of Italy in 887, but soon lost control of most of his lands to Guy III of Spoleto, who proclaimed himself king of Italy and emperor. Berengar was saved by the intervention of Arnulf of Carinthia in 894; they together defeated Guy of Spoleto, who died shortly after. However, after Arnulf was crowned King of Italy and Emperor, he named his illegitimate son Ratold sub-king of Italy. Ratold and Berengar agreed to divide Italy between themselves, but soon after they started to fight for supremacy. When Ratold died unexpectedly, Berengar remained as sole rule, and started to aspire to the title of emperor. Aware of this, Arnulf, very ill, could not go personally to campaign in Italy, but concluded an alliance with the leaders of the Hungarians, who had in 895-896 occupied the Eastern parts of the Carpathian Basin, convincing them to send an army to attack Berengar. Arnulf was accused by his enemies of having concluded the alliance with the Hungarians by cutting a dog and a wolf in two, in a pagan way. This was how these nomadic peoples made alliances, with the parties swearing to keep the alliance and cursing themselves to die like the animals they had cut in half if they broke their oath. This shows that Arnulf was aware of the Hungarian threat to the eastern provinces of his realm, especially the March of Pannonia. So the alliance seems to have had two purposes: to punish Berengar, and to divert the Hungarians from invading Pannonia so at least for a while he could be assured that they would not attack him. He may have hoped that these two dangerous neighbors would weaken each other.

== Prelude ==
Hungarian armies had entered Italy before. Military intelligence was one of the most important features of nomadic warfare. Starting a war without knowing the enemy's power, number of soldiers, will to fight, etc., was unimaginable in the nomadic societies. This is why in late October 898 they sent a lightly armored, quick moving small unit on reconnaissance, crossing Pannonia on their way to Northern Italy before arriving in Friuli. They camped three days with their tents near the river Brenta, sending their scouts in small groups to reconnoiter the land, its wealth, the number and the fighting spirit of the enemy troops, the routes of attack and retreat, the places which could be chosen as battlefields, where the most spoils were to be found, and the cities and the defensive works. It is certain that the place of the future battle was chosen during this minor incursion. The exact size of the reconnaissance force is not known, but according to Marco Polo, in the Mongolian Empire such reconnaissance units were composed of 200 riders, implying that the Hungarian force comprised about 100 to 200 riders. After three days the small groups they sent in every direction, returned, analyzed the information they gained, then returned home.

As Liutprand of Cremona mentions, after returning home, the Hungarians used the winter to prepare equipment and train their youth. In 899, a Hungarian army entered Italy. Historians do not agree about the route they took. Gyula Kristó argues that they bypassed Pannonia and went westwards, following the courses of the rivers Sava and Drava and entering Italy near Aquileia, on the road named after them, Strata Hungarorum, due to the fact that they used it so often during the next decades and centuries. According to István Bóna, the Hungarian army, with the permission of Arnulf, crossed Pannonia, then headed towards Italy on the ancient road Via Gemina, which linked the ancient cities Celeia, Ljubljana and Aquileia, arrived in Italy. Historians also differ about the time of the year in which the Hungarian army reached Italy. According to Kristó, basing on the account of Liutprand, they arrived in February–March. Bóna believes, according to the account of Catalogus abbatum nonantulorum that they arrived in August 899.

On entering Italy, the Hungarians passed the strong walls of Aquileia without attacking it, then scattered in smaller groups, attacking the surroundings of Treviso, Vicenza, Verona, Brescia, Bergamo, Milan, Pavia, destroying Feltre, with one group reaching the Great St Bernard Pass. Usually the Hungarian nomadic warriors did not attack castles and big cities surrounded by walls, because they were not skilled in sieges and had no siege machinery, so they plundered and burned monasteries, gathering spoils along the way.

As Liutprand of Cremona mentions, hearing of the appearance of the Hungarians in his kingdom, Berengar I was very surprised that this army from a nation he had never heard of had appeared so suddenly. He sent envoys and letters into every corner of his country ordering his subjects to send their troops to him to fight the Hungarians. After all his troops had gathered, his army was about three times the size of the Hungarians'. According to Chronicon Sagornini of John the Deacon, the Italian army had 15,000 men, so we can infer that the Hungarians numbered about 5,000. This number could be exaggerated, as medieval chroniclers often did with the size of armies, but there is no reason not to accept the claim that the Italians were three times more numerous than the Hungarians, as contemporary chroniclers generally exaggerated the size of enemy armies relative to theirs. Convinced of his superiority, Berengar allegedly caroused with some of his friends in a town instead of attacking the Hungarian army immediately. This gave time to the Hungarian troops, scattered to plunder every corner of the Italian kingdom, to retreat towards a gathering place, one not precisely specified, on the bank of the river Brenta, which was probably chosen from the beginning to be the place of the battle. Seeing this, King Berengar thought that they were frightened by the number of his troops and started to pursue them, thinking he had already won. His cavalry even managed to surprise a Hungarian group, forcing it to cross the River Adda in haste, causing the drowning of many of them. But generally the retreat was a success, as the Hungarians' light armor and weapons allowed their cavalry to move more quickly than the more heavily equipped Carolingian Italian cavalry. (Magyar commoners, who usually carried out the pillaging raids, wore only leather armor; only elites had lamellar armour, and their weapons were always composite bows; their melee weapons were sabres, and rarely battle axes or maces.) The Hungarians retreated along the old Roman Via Postumia.

The Hungarian retreat also served as part of their psychological warfare, which had the goal of inducing over-confidence in Berengar and the belief that he had already won the war against them, thus lulling his vigilance. To augment this, the Hungarians sent envoys to Berengar, promising that they would give up all their plunder and asking only to be allowed a safe return to their homeland; but the over-confident Berengar and his commanders refused this, believing that it would be an easy task to take them all prisoner. Although the chronicler Liutprand believes that the Hungarians were frightened, hopeless, and just wanted to escape alive, the modern historians consider that this was only a clever role-playing, in order to get the Italians into a mood which would lead to their defeat. The role-playing of the Hungarian army was almost exposed when the Italian vanguard reached the Hungarian rearguard at the "wide fields" of Verona and forced it to fight, and the Magyars were forced to defeat the Italians, in order to escape, although probably it was not among the commanders' plans to expose their strength before the final battle. But when Berengar's main forces arrived, the Hungarian rearguard ran away, continuing its retreat. But Berengar did not take this sign too seriously, and continued to chase the fleeing Hungarians.

After this long pursuit, on 24 September 899, the Hungarians and the Italians arrived to the river Brenta, after the "most ingenious planned flight of the world history", as István Bóna points. He probably names this retreat so, because of the multiple results it produced:

- The Hungarians managed to retreat without great losses,
- They concentrated their troops on the place they formerly chose for the battle,
- Using the tactics of military deception they misled the enemy commanders about their plans,
- With the use of the psychological warfare (persuading the enemy that they are weak, thus making him overconfident) they "prepared" them to be defeated.

The nomadic armies used the tactic of feigned retreat very often in the ancient and medieval times, and the Hungarians were masters of it, using it in many battles of the period of their invasions of Europe (899-970). Liutprand mentions that the horses of the Hungarians were very tired, but they had the strength to cross the river before the Italians arrived, so Brenta separated the two armies from each other. The heavily armored Italians could not pass the river so easily, so they remained on the other side, and both armies assembled their battle lines on the both sides of the river.

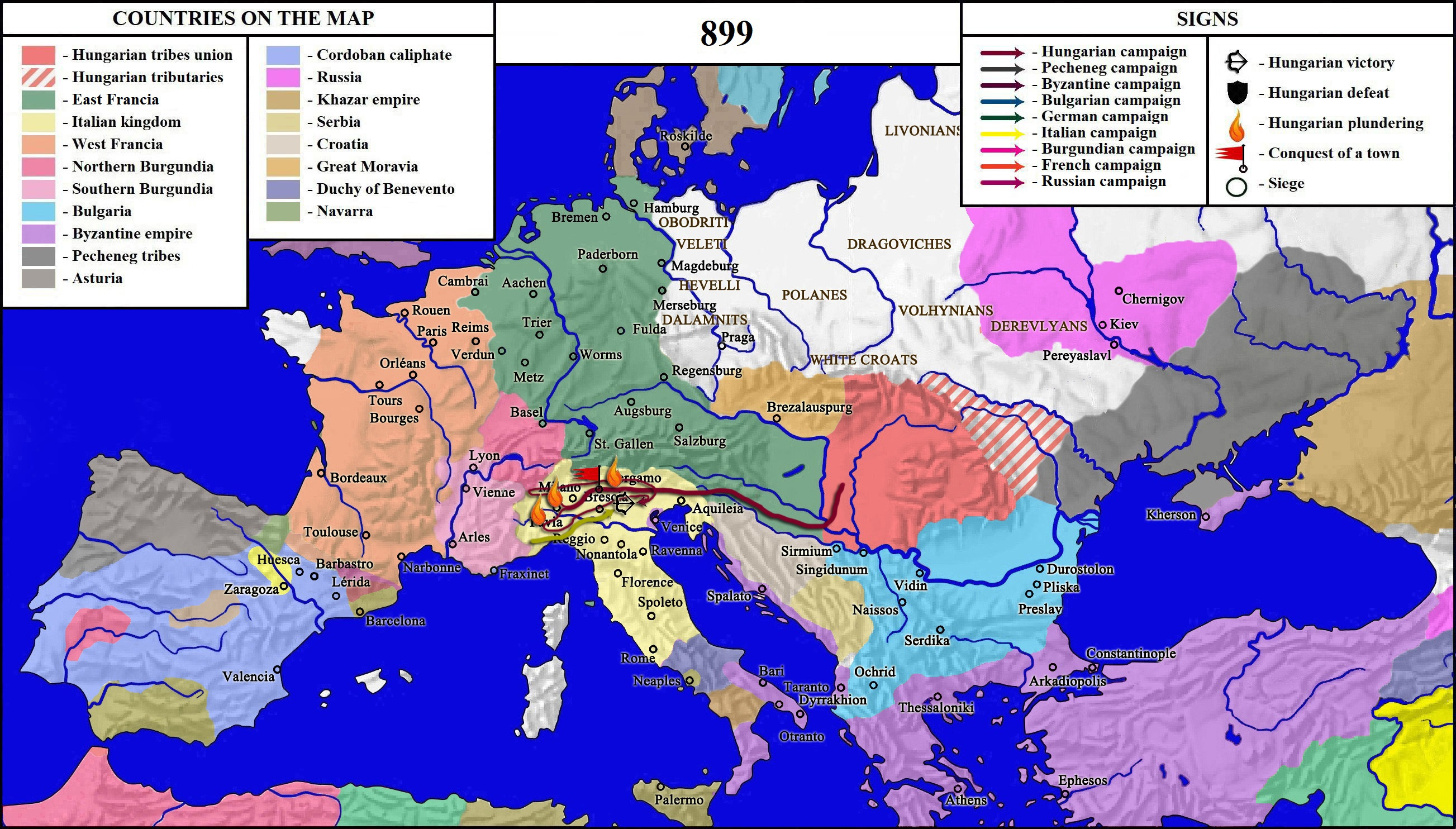
The events leading to the Battle of Brenta.

Then the Hungarians again sent envoys to the Italian side, this time with even more alluring propositions for the Italians; in return for their safe return home, they promised to give them everything: prisoners, equipment, weapons, horses, keeping only one for each of them for their homecoming. To show how serious they are about this proposal, they promised that they will never return to Italy, and as guarantees for this, they will send their own sons to the Italians. With these exaggerate but still unacceptable promises (knowing that Berengar will not accept their departure after the destruction they caused, and would want to take them all prisoners), the Hungarians managed to totally convince the king that their fate depends only from his goodwill. So the Italians responded harshly, threatening them, probably wanting their total surrender.

The Hungarians waited for this moment. The Italians assembled a fortified camp, which however was not sufficiently guarded, left their guard down, and many of them started to eat and drink, to refresh after the long and exhausting pursuit, waiting the continuation of the negotiations, because Berengar thought that the Magyars are too weak and tired to fight, so they are at his mercy. But at the other side of the Brenta river was probably not only the tired, pursued Magyar army group, but other Hungarian troops too which at the start of the campaign, were sent in other directions to plunder, and in the meantime they returned for the battle, and also those who remained in their permanent camp placed in that very place from the beginning of the campaign, because it was chosen a year ago in their reconnaissance incursion. In their campaigns in Europe, the Hungarians in every country they stayed longer, chose a place to be their permanent camp during their stay in the region (in 926 the Abbey of Saint Gall, in 937 in France the Abbey of Saint Basolus near Verzy, in the same year the meadows of Galliano near Capua, where they stood for 12 days), so knowing these, it is highly probable, that the principal camp and the rallying point of the Hungarians was on the meadows near the Brenta river. So, without Berengar's knowledge, on the other side of the river were a great number of fresh troops with fresh horses, which just waited to start the battle.

== Battle ==
When the Italians were totally unaware and relaxed, the Hungarians sent three units of troops to cross the river on some remote places, and to place themselves on different strategical points around the Italian camp. When these units took their places, the main Hungarian army crossed the river, at an area away from the detection of the Italians, and directly charged the unsuspecting Italians outside the camp, starting a massacre among them.

The majority of the Italians were in the fortified camp, eating and drinking, when the three Hungarian units sent in ambush, encircled the camp and started to shoot arrows, and caught the Italians so off guard, that Liutprand writes that many of them still ate in the moment, when the Hungarians arrows, or lances pierced the food in their throats. Of course, Liutprand could be exaggerating when he writes that the Italians were killed with the food in their throats, but nevertheless he expresses with this image the total surprise caused by the Hungarian attack to the Italians. This simultaneous attack on the Italians inside and outside of the camp, prevented them from helping each other. The Hungarians who attacked the camp, destroyed the defences preventing the Italians from barricading themselves in the camp, shot continuously arrows on the Italians trapped in it, and probably waited for the main army to finish the Italians outside, then they stormed together inside the fortified camp, because the Italians, due to their surprise and terror, were in impossibility to organize a defence of it, and started a slaughter. The Italians were totally off guard, and was impossible for them to organize a resistance, being caught in this way, so the only option was to flee. But when some of them arrived to the place where their horses were camped, they saw that it was already taken by Hungarian warriors, so these Italians were massacred by them. Probably one of the three Hungarian units sent before to encircle the Italian camp had the duty to occupy the stables before the battle even started.

Some Italians tried to stay away from the little pockets of fight, forming groups in an attempt to resist, hoping that if they show themselves peaceful and friends to the Hungarians, they will be spared, but they too were massacred.

The Hungarians, after crushing all tiny attempts of resistance, showed no mercy to the Italians, who in the course of the days spent in chasing them, then after their arriving to the Brenta river, when they sent their envoys asking for an agreement, insulted them so many times, so they killed even those who wanted to surrender.

The number of the Italian losses was huge. Annales Fuldenses show the number of the Italians killed as 20,000 men. This is of course an exaggerated number, knowing that the Italian army composed maximum 15,000 men, but shows that the losses were really high. Catalogus abbatum nonantulorum writes about thousands of Christian deaths, the Chronicon of Regino of Prüm writes about the uncountable masses of the people killed with arrows, or Chronicon Sagornini of John the Deacon points that "few of them [the Italians] turned back home". The Hungarian losses were low, since they encountered almost no resistance.

King Berengar managed to escape to Pavia, changing his dress with the clothing of one of his soldiers.

== Aftermath ==
After this victory the whole Italian Kingdom lied on the mercy of the Hungarians. With no Italian army to oppose them, the Hungarians decided to spend the mild winter in Italy, continuing to attack monasteries, castles and cities, trying to conquer them, like they did before they had started to be chased by Berengar's army.

On 13 December 899 they attacked Vercelli, where the bishop of Vercelli and archchancellor of the Carolingian Empire, Liutward, trying to escape them, taking with him his treasures, accidentally stumbled upon them, so he was killed and his treasures taken away. On 26 January 900 they conquered Modena, and two days later the Abbey of Nonantola, where they burned the monastery and the church, and killed monks.

In the meantime, on 8 December 899, emperor Arnulf died in Regensburg, so the alliance between East Francia and the Principality of Hungary lost its validity. The Hungarian envoys sent from the new home of the Hungarians, the eastern part of the Carpathian Basin, to negotiate the renewal of the alliance, were seen as spies by the guardian and councillor of the new king, the 6 year old Louis the Child, Hatto I, Archbishop of Mainz and his advisers, and sent home, having achieved nothing. This started a state of war between the two political communities, so the Principality of Hungary needed the Hungarian army from Italy, which, because they became an important task in the conquest of Pannonia, which was planned by the Hungarians. They had to attack the Bavarian province from South West in the same time when another Hungarian army attacked it from East.

Before the Hungarians left Italy, in the spring of 900, they concluded peace with Berengar, who gave them in exchange for they departure hostages, and money for the peace. After this defeat, or at the latest from 904, Berengar started to pay them tribute regularly, and until his death in 924, and in exchange the Hungarians helped him against every enemies that he had. As Liuprand writes, the Hungarians became Berengar's friends. It seems that, in time, some of the Hungarian leaders became his personal friends.

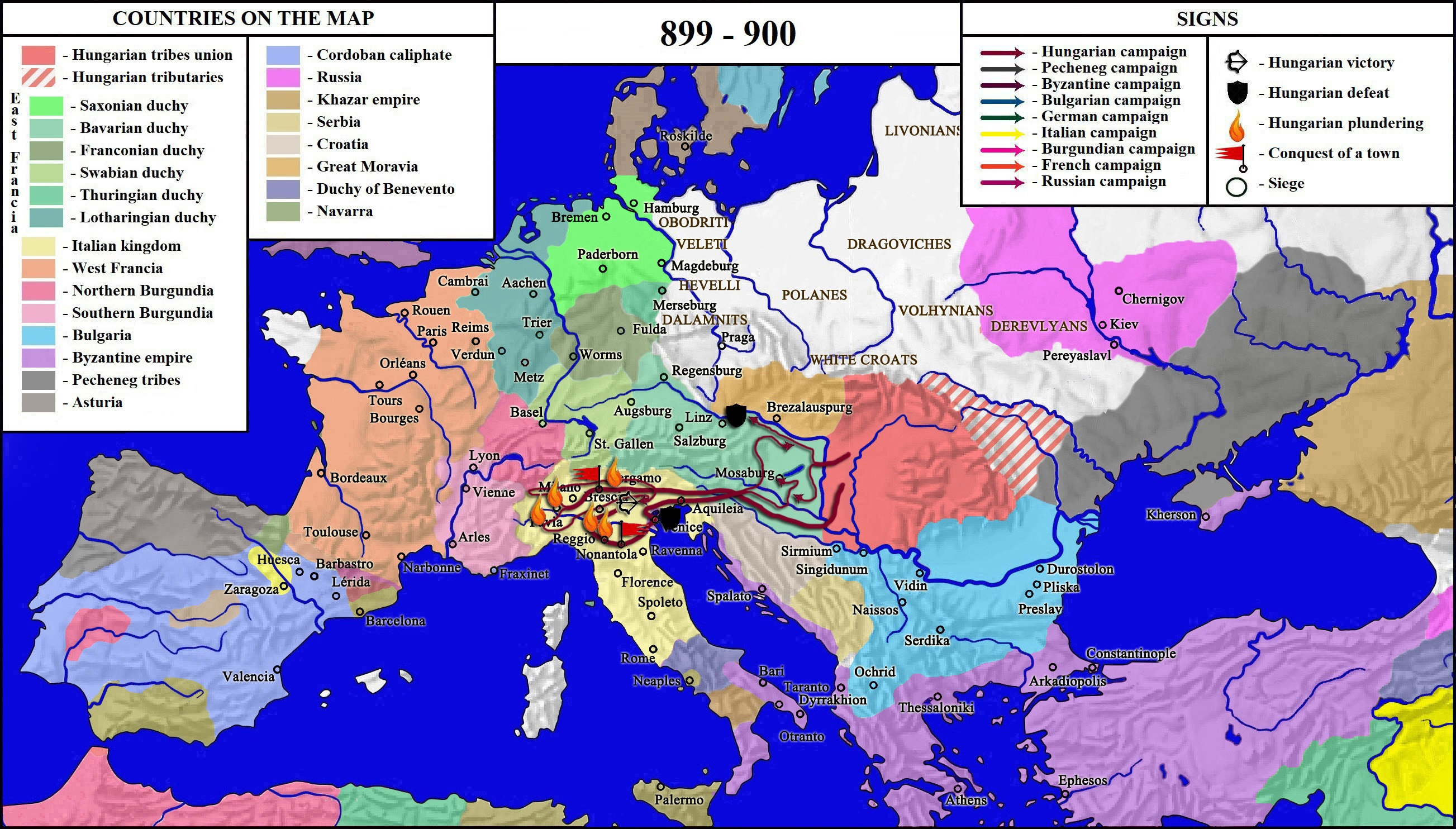
The Hungarian campaign in Italy, with the Battle of Brenta, then the campaign which resulted the capture of Dunántúl.

On their way back home, the Hungarians accomplished a military performance, which was never even tried by a land army in the history. Having no ships, boats or any kind of watercraft, on 29 June 900, they "embarked" on a sea campaign against Venice. As Chronicon Sagornini of John the Deacon writes that with their horses and "leather ships" to attack first the cities from the coast, then also the city of Venice itself. The "leather ship" here refer to an animal skin (goat, sheep, maybe cow) tied up to form something like a huge bota bag, filled with air, tied on their horses sides, which helped the warrior and his horse to float, with which the Hungarians and the warriors of other nomadic societies usually used to cross rivers. They first attacked and burned the coastal towns like Equilio, Cittanova, Fine, Capo d'Argine, then tying the filled animal skins to their horses, they crossed the waters of the Lagoon of Venice, and sacked the island town of Chioggia, which was a part of the Dogado (homeland of the Republic of Venice). Then on the day of the martyrdom of Saint Peter and Saint Paul (29 June), on their "leather ships", they tried to enter Rialto and Malamocco, but before they reached the islands, on the place called Albiola the doge of Venice Pietro Tribuno met them with the Venetian war fleet, forcing them to retreat. Although they lost this unusual sea battle, the Hungarians achieved something what was never done by a land army: attacking islands lying in the sea. And although the attack from 29 June was unsuccessful, they succeeded in the attack on the island of Chioggia. This attack was not a violation of the agreement with Berengar, because at that time Venice was not part of the Italian kingdom, but was an autonomous republic under Byzantine influence.

Historians disagree about the route taken by which the army returned to the Hungarian lands. On one hand György Szabados believes that the Hungarian army turned back home from Italy without entering Pannonia, avoiding it from the south, because in his opinion they were exhausted of continuous fighting in Italy in the last year, and were loaded up with plunders, so they would not be capable to accomplish such an important mission. The same opinion had György Györffy too in 1974.

On the other hand, Gyula Kristó and István Bóna think that the Hungarian army returning from Italy took part in the conquest of Pannonia, but in different ways. Kristó believes that the returning Hungarian army had the task only to plunder the land, weakening the capability of the inhabitants to withstand the final attack, then crossed the Danube, turning home, and after that two new Hungarian armies, coming from East accomplished the occupation. Bóna believes that the returning Hungarian army played an active role in the conquest of Pannonia, coming from the southwest, when other armies coming from east, from the Eastern part of the Carpathian Basin, crossed the Danube, attacking it from the north and east. He thinks that the Hungarian army came back from Italy because they received an order from home to come help in the conquering of Pannonia, accomplishing it with an encircling movement.
