= Paolo Lucio Anafesto =

First Doge of Venice from 697 to 717

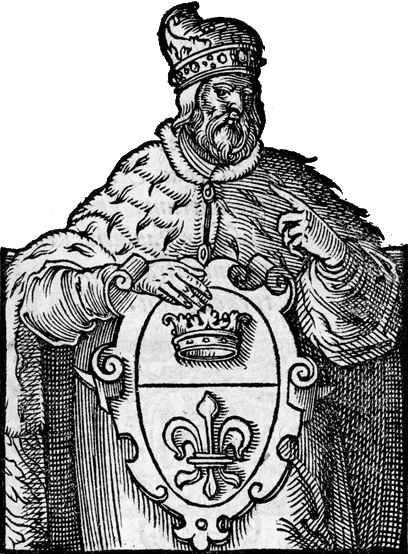
- Late artistic representation (1574) of Paolo Lucio Anafesto

1st (traditionally) Doge of Venice
- In office 697 – 717 (traditionally)
- Preceded by: Office established (traditionally)
- Succeeded by: Marcello Tegalliano

Personal details
- Died: 717

Paolo Lucio Anafesto (Latin: Paulucius Anafestus) was, according to Venetian chronicler John the Deacon and other later traditions, the first Doge of Venice, serving (allegedly) from 697 to 717. Since he is not known from contemporary sources, various scholars have raised several questions regarding his personal (prosopographical) historicity and reliability of late accounts, provided by John the Deacon, who died sometime after 1018.

== Traditional accounts ==
Traditional accounts on Anafesto are based on John the Deacon's work, known as Chronicon Venetum et Gradense, written at the beginning of the 11th century, and also on several other, much later traditions. According to such sources, Anafesto was a nobleman from Eraclea, then the main town in the region. He was elected in 697 as duke, with official jurisdiction over the entire Venetian lagoon. His job was to both put an end to the conflicts between the various tribunes who until then had governed the differing towns, and to coordinate the defense against the Lombards and the Slavs who were encroaching on their settlements. He also repelled Umayyad attacks and raids onto the region.

== Historical criticism ==
Anafesto's existence is uncorroborated by any source before the 11th century. Analyzing accounts of John the Deacon, in light of the Pactum Lotharii from 840, modern scholars have pointed out that John's accounts might have been derived from data on some contemporary dignitaries, such as Paul (a Byzantine Exarch of Ravenna), or some of neighboring Lombard dukes who had similar name. Moreover, a subordinate of exarch Paul, magister militum Marcellus, similarly corresponds to the alleged Anafesto's successor Marcello Tegalliano, thus casting doubt on the authenticity of John the Deacon's account on both of them.

== See also ==
- Byzantine Venetia

== Sources ==
- Anonymous, Archivo Storico Italiano, Tomo VIII: Cronaca Altinate. Florence, Italy, 1845.
- Cosentino, Salvatore, ed. (2021). A Companion to Byzantine Italy. Boston-Leiden: Brill. ISBN 978-90-04-30770-4.
- Gasparri, Stefano (2018). "The First Dukes and the Origins of Venice". Venice and Its Neighbors from the 8th to 11th Century: Through Renovation and Continuity. Leiden-Boston: Brill. pp. 5–26. ISBN 978-90-04-35361-9.
- Norwich, John Julius, A History of Venice. Alfred A. Knopf: New York, 1982.
- Pazienza, Annamaria (2018). "Archival Documents as Narrative: The Sources of the Istoria Veneticorum and the Plea of Rižana". Venice and Its Neighbors from the 8th to 11th Century: Through Renovation and Continuity. Leiden-Boston: Brill. pp. 27–50. ISBN 978-90-04-35361-9.
- Skoblar, Magdalena, ed. (2021). Byzantium, Venice and the Medieval Adriatic: Spheres of Maritime Power and Influence, c. 700-1453. Cambridge: Cambridge University Press. ISBN 978-1-108-84070-5.

Political offices
New title	Doge of Venice; 697–717	Succeeded by Marcello Tegalliano
