= Venetikà =

District of the Exarchate of Ravenna

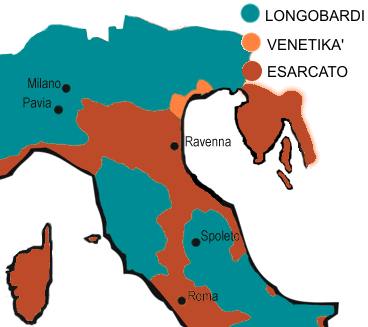
Territories of the Lombards, the Exarchate, and Venetikà

The Venetikà (Greek: Βενετικὰ, Latin: Venetia) was a district of the Exarchate of Ravenna founded in 584 by Byzantine emperor Mauritius, divided from the previous Roman eparchy. In 697 the district was raised to the Duchy of Venice.

== History and territory ==
The creation of the district took place in the context of a more general reorganization of the Byzantine imperial possessions in Italy following the disastrous invasion of the Lombards, which having started in 568, quickly caused the expulsion of the Byzantines from much of northern and central Italy. However, the lombards were not able to take the Venetian coastal area.

The Mauritian reform came just four years after the previous reorganization wanted by Tiberius II, resulting in a fragmentation of the provinces that were actually smaller and more self-sufficient from a defensive point of view.

The Venetikà then extended only to the Adriatic coast, with the new lagoon centers arising as a result of the invasions, and a few Roman cities, including Padua, Monselice, Opitergio and Altino. The latter were however soon removed from the Byzantines by Lombard pressure, forcing them to retreat to the lagoons.

Even the patriarch, the highest ecclesiastical authority, moved from Aquileia to Grado. In the face of the relentless decline of imperial control over Italy and the growing weakness of Exarchate, threatened in its own capital, Ravenna, around 697 the Venetia was, like many other Italic possessions, assigned to the government of a duke.

As imperial control weakened, the new duchy acquired more and more independence until it became the Republic of Venice.

The Venétikoi, the inhabitants of the Venetikà, through ingenuity and hard work, were able to turn a poor and unappealing land into a conglomerate of industrious islands. They are the ancestors of the modern Venetians.
