= Maritime Venice =

Territory of Byzantine Italy (584–751 CE) in Venice; precursor to Venetian Republic

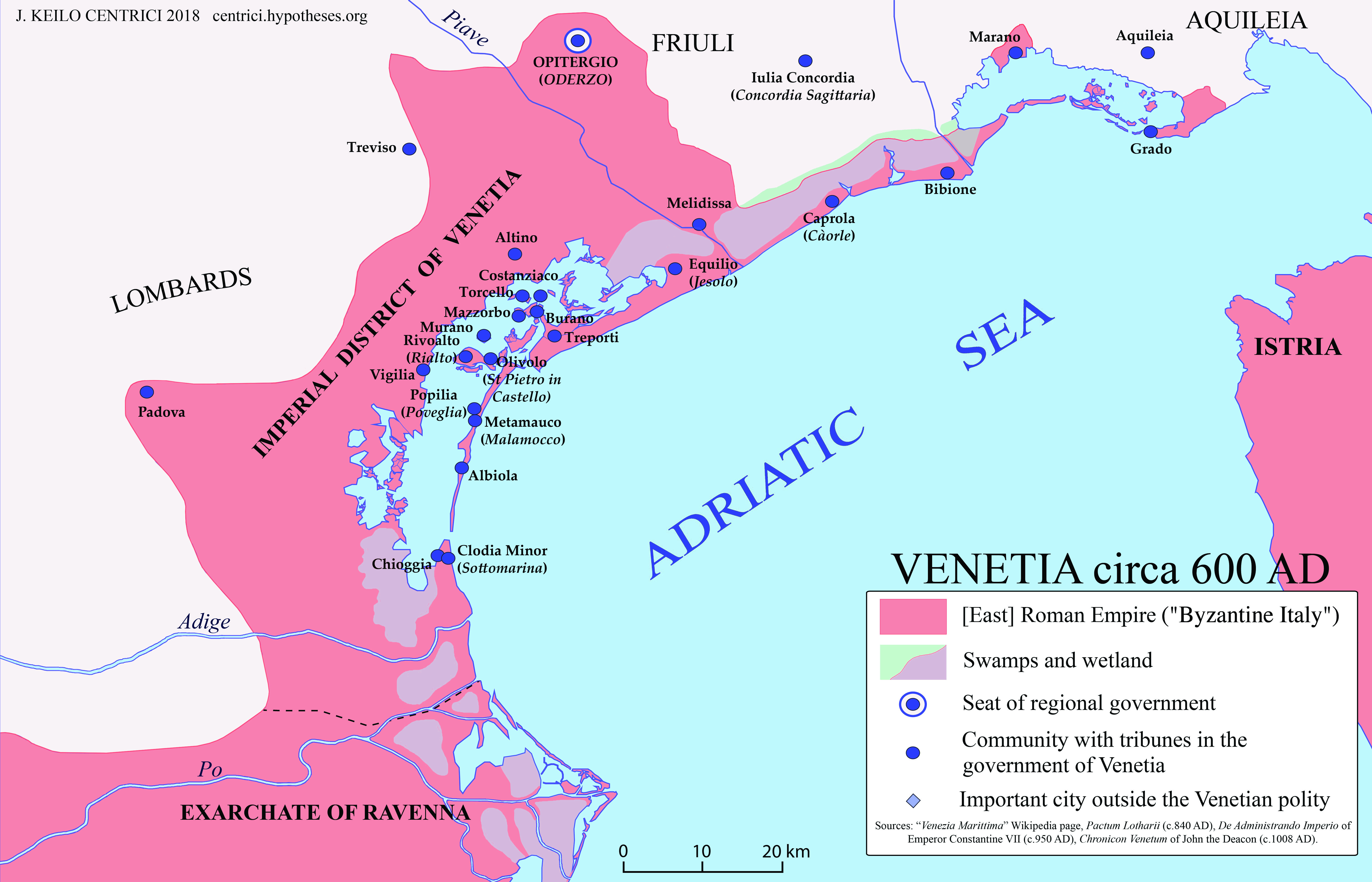
Byzantine Venetia and neighboring regions, around 600

Byzantine Venetia (Greek: Bενετικὰ, romanized: Venetikà), also known as the Byzantine Maritime Venetia (Latin: Venetia maritima), or Maritime Venice (Italian: Venezia marittima), was a territory of the Byzantine Empire, within the Exarchate of Ravenna, that existed from the middle of the 6th century, up to the second half of the 7th century. Its territory was corresponding to the coastal belt of ancient Venetia and Istria, encompassing coastal regions of present-day Veneto, and Friuli-Venezia Giulia, including the Venetian Lagoon. Its territory did not include hinterland of the old Venetian province, which was conquered by the Lombards. Within Byzantine domains in Italy, Maritime Venetia had a peripheral position, characterized by a patchwork of settlements without major urban centers, besides Oderzo (Latin: Opitergium), the capital city of the province.

== History ==
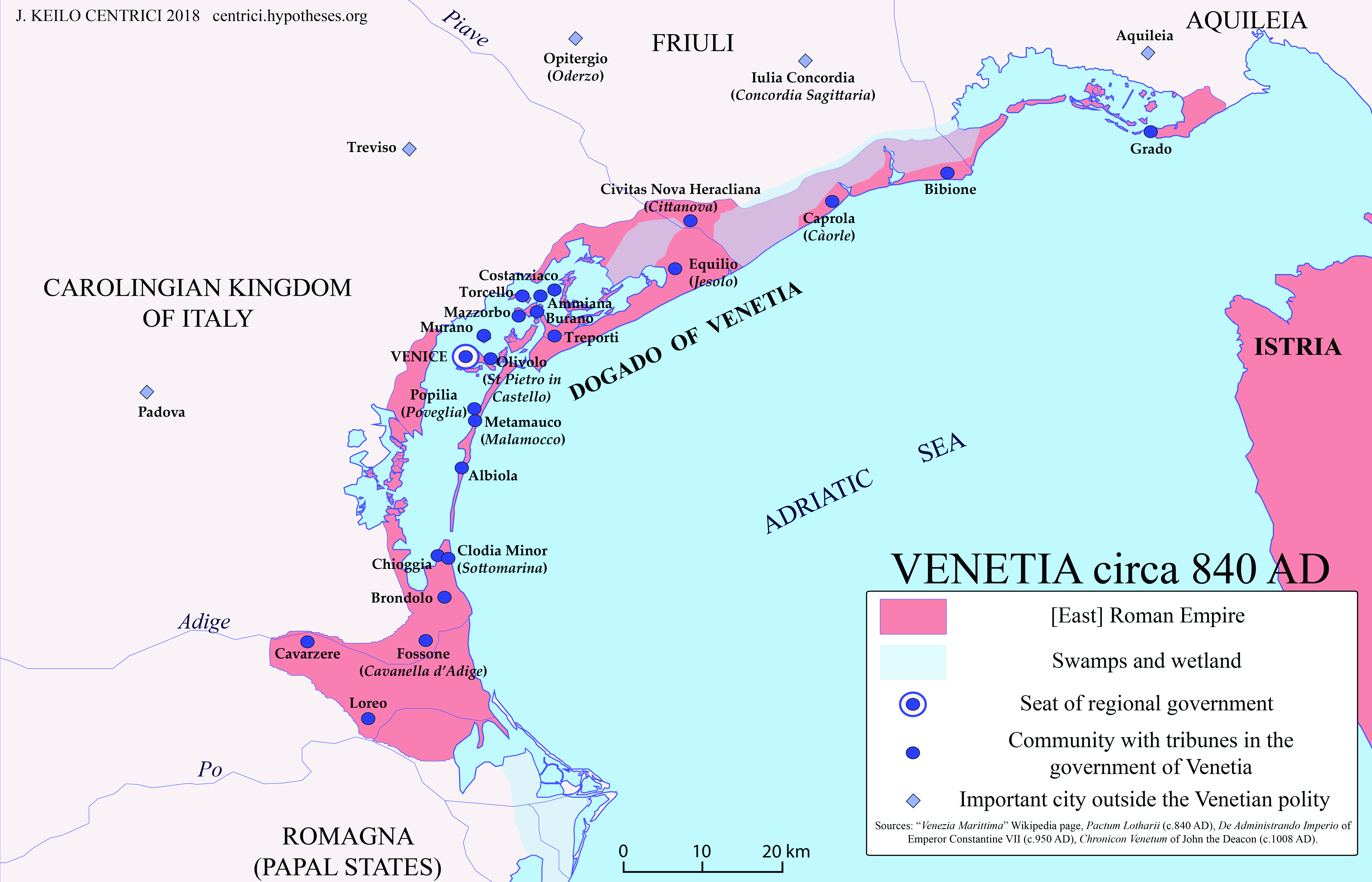
Remaining parts of Byzantine Venetia, by the 9th century

During the Gothic War (535–554), Byzantine rule was established on the entire territory of the ancient Roman province of Venetia and Istria, with its traditional administrative and ecclesiastical center in Aquileia, but already in 568, Italy was invaded by Lombards, who conquered the entire hinterland, including the capital city of Aquileia, thus reducing Byzantine rule to coastal regions of Venetia and Istria. Administrative center of the remaining parts of the province thus moved to Oderzo, while ecclesiastical center moved to Grado, and the province was consequently placed under the jurisdiction of the newly created Exarchate of Ravenna.

By the end of the 6th century and during the first half of the 7th century, the remaining territory of the province was further reduced by constant Lombard pressures, and by the end of the 7th century it was practically reduced to the region of Venetian Lagoon, protected by its specific geographical position, that allowed its inhabitants to organize successful defence, aided by maritime support of the powerful Byzantine fleet.

By that time, towns in the region of Venetian Lagoon developed a specific form of political autonomy. The Dogado, or Duchy of Venice was formally established at this time. This was a semi-autonomous nascent city-state under nominal Byzantine jurisdiction, governed by a duke (Ital.: "doge") who was to be elected by his peers from the city's ruling class. Its administrative center was the Rialto. According to tradition, Paolo Lucio Anafesto, first Doge of Venice, founded the Republic of Venice in the year 697.

== Territory and settlements ==
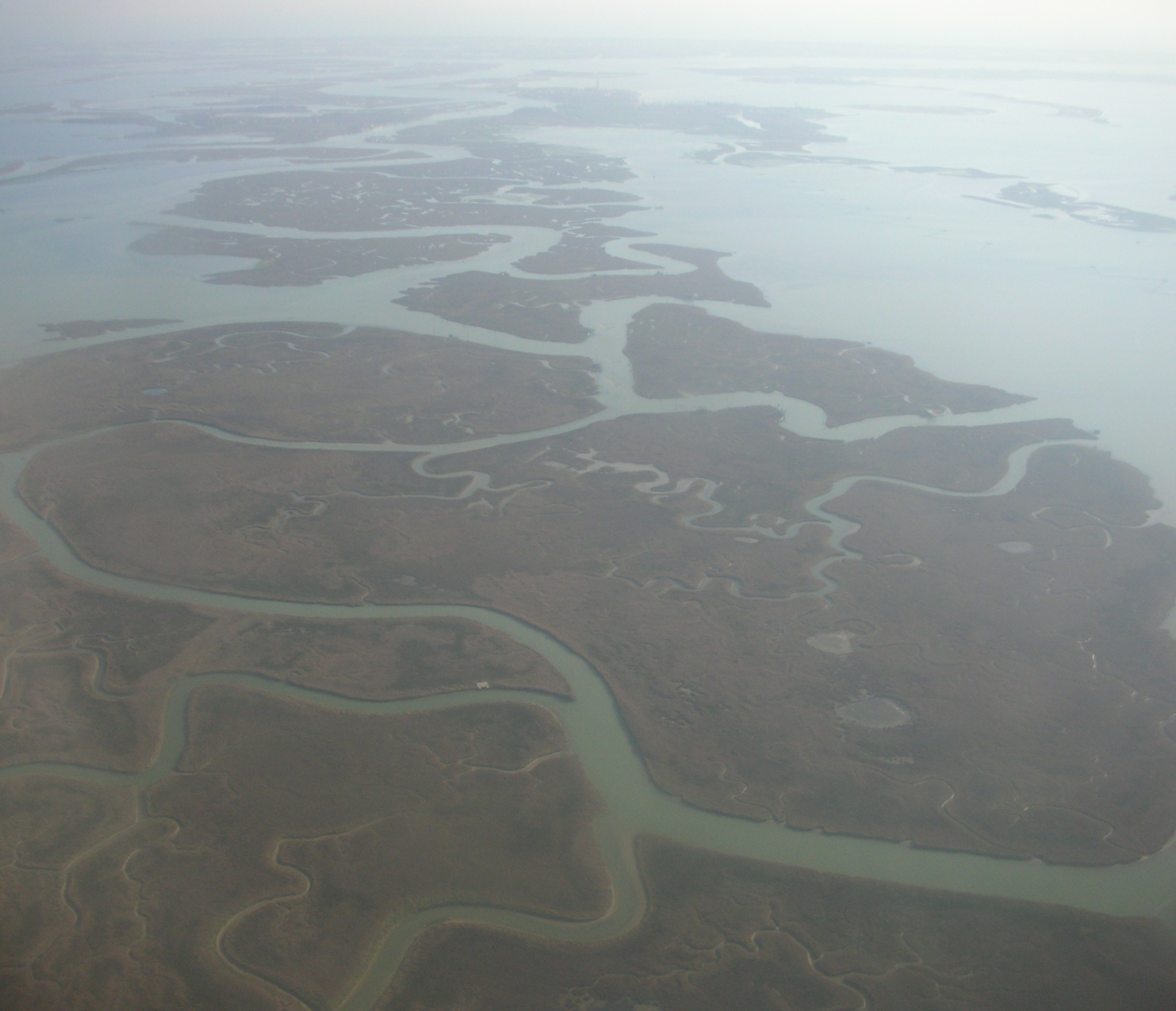
The Venice lagoon today: the lagoon environment allowed the development of new urban centers - safe from threats from the mainland - which formed the basis of the new Venetia maritima.

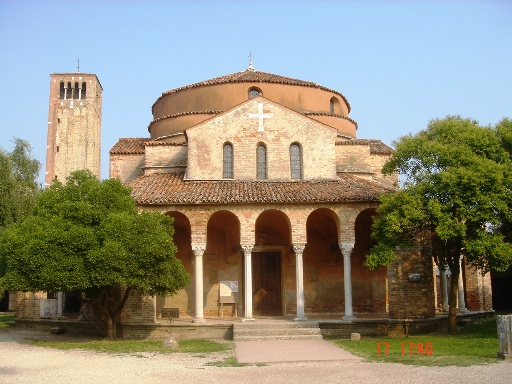
The martyrium of Santa Fosca in Torcello: dating back to the twelfth century, the building exhibits marked Byzantine influences.

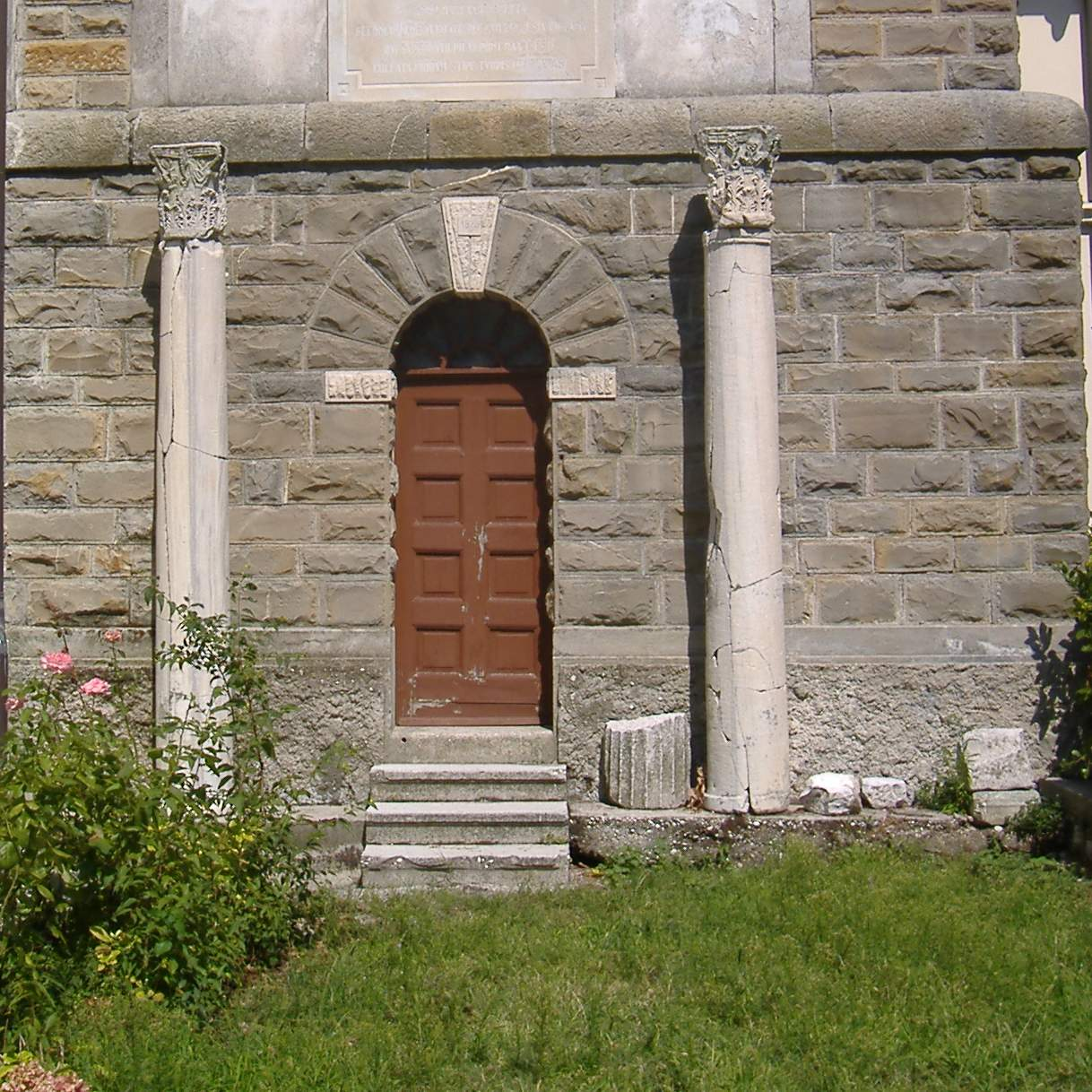
Ancient columns belonging to the early Christian sanctuary of the Madonna di Barbana, in Grado, dating back to the sixth century.

Venetia Maritima emerged as a result of the Lombard occupation of a large part of the current Veneto region and the progressive migration of Roman populations. These Romans came from the fall of Aquileia, leading to new coastal settlements, protected by the lagoons and the imperial fleet. The Romans who migrated from mainland Venetia to build new settlements on the Adriatic islands did not intend to permanently abandon the region, as they imagined returning to the cities they'd been forced to evacuate once it was safe to do so. Similar migrations took place in Istria, in the Veneto hinterland between the rivers Adige and Brenta, and in Dalmatia a few decades later following the invasion of the Avars .

John the Deacon, writing shortly after the year 1000, described the islands that comprised the province:

The first of these is called Grado, which has high walls and many churches adorned and full of saints’ bodies, just as it was in ancient Venice, Aquileia, so that it is generally known as the capital and metropolis of the new Venice. The second island...is called Bibione. The third...Caprola. [T]he fourth island, in which until recently there was a grandiose city built by the emperor Heraclius... The fifth island is called Equilo ... On the sixth island is Torcello, which stands out for the fact that it is possible not to keep city walls... The seventh island is known as Mureana. [I]n the eighth island is Rivoalto, in which finally the people came together to live...and in which...the wealth of houses and churches flaunted. The ninth island is called Metamauco...surrounded by a beautiful coastline... Then there is the tenth island, Popilia. The eleventh is called Chioggia Minore, in which is the beautiful monastery of San Michele. On the twelfth island is Chioggia Maggiore. There is also a castle on the border of Venice, which is called Capo d'Argile ... [T]here are numerous other habitable islands in that province

— John the Deacon, Istoria Veneticorum, I-7

== Economy ==
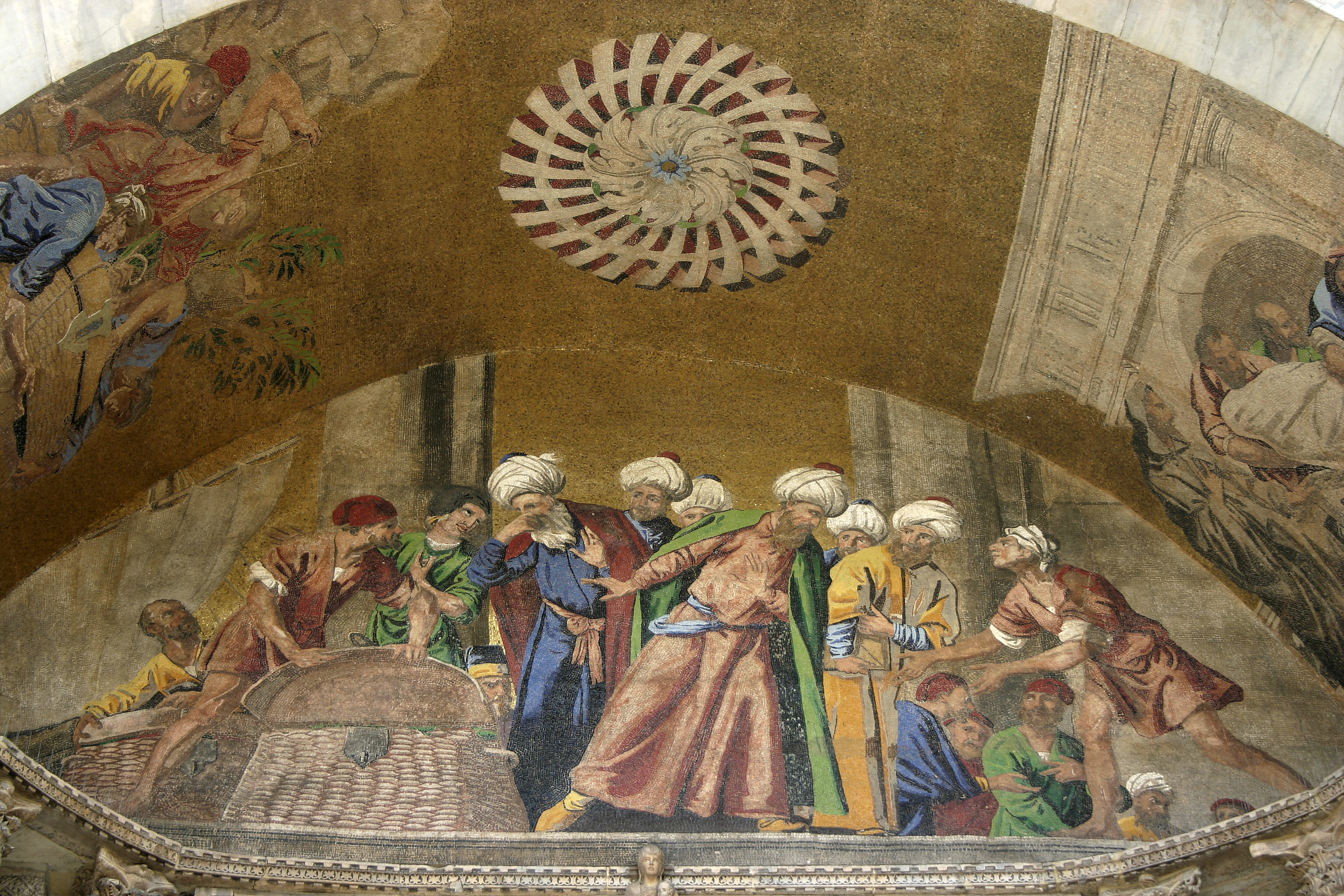
Venetic merchants steal the body of San Marco from Alexandria in Egypt: from the mosaics of the basilica of San Marco in Venice.

Having largely escaped the upheavals of the Migration Period (still popularly known as the "Barbarian Invasions") the local population readily adopted commerce, enabled by the protection afforded by canals and islands and by tax privileges offered by the Byzantine rulers to their Italian subjects. The precarious geographical conditions in Byzantine Venetia favored new social and economic models, stemming from the traditional Roman lagoon activities such as fishing, glass production, and salt extraction.

Data on the economic situation of Venetia Maritima were collected thanks to a series of studies carried out on the archaeological excavations of Torcello in the mid-1950s. From the Roman age to the early Middle Ages the territory of the lagoon was used mainly, if not exclusively, for the production of salt or for other minor activities related to fishing and dredging of the coast. Navigation was already important at the time of the reign of the Gothic Vitiges, whose minister Cassiodorus thus addressed the Venetians:

To the Maritime Tribunes
The Senator and Prefect of the Praetorium

With a previous command, we ordered Istria to happily send the wines and oils it enjoys in abundance to the Ravenna residence this year. You, who have numerous ships to connect with it, provide with the same act of devotion to quickly transport what it is ready to give. (...) So be ready for such a short trip, you who often cross infinite spaces. (...) It adds to your comfort that another way always opens, safe and quiet. In that when the sea is barred by the roaring of the winds, another path is offered to you among very pleasant rivers. Your hulls do not fear harsh breaths, they touch the ground with the greatest happiness and they do not know how to perish, they that so frequently sail from the coast. Not seeing the body, it sometimes happens that they seem to be trimmed for the grasslands and move towed by ropes. (...) "

The Roman economic system held up until the beginning of Byzantine rule, and until then the unity of the province was maintained. At the time of Narsete, the various arts already met in guilds, called scholae, protected by a patron: this included the arts of blacksmiths, centonars, fulli, merchants, shopkeepers, stonemasons, potters, painters, etc.

The forced increase of the population due to the migrations from Veneto led to a radical change in the economic production of the area, which from the periphery became a real market. Since the Lombard invasion, a fairly substantial agricultural production was activated, including export products such as pine nuts, walnuts, hazelnuts, peaches and plums, as well as vines and cucumbers, in a local variety still present in Torcello. The growth of the population then led to a second transformation of the territory which, becoming a city area, saw the demand for artisanal products grow. This caused the development of the ceramic industry and finally the glass art (as early as 639 in the church of Torcello the first mosaics appeared with glass tesserae). Torcello was about to become a real commercial center, a «μέγαν ἐμπόριον» (megan emporion, "large market") already in the time of Costantino Porfirogenito. Only the building technique remained the same as the mainland, both in construction materials and in the most common artisan productions, which also felt the influence of the Lombard models.

=== The development of mercantilism ===
Venetian commercial activities had always naturally taken place between the Po-Veneto plain and the vast stretch of coast that reaches Ravenna from Trieste (in a broader sense also Istria). In fact, these areas were crossed by the Annia and Postumia streets and by the network of rivers and navigable canals guaranteed by the lagoon system. This merchant bond, despite various conflicts, continued uninterrupted until the eighth century. This ended when Adriano I confiscated the Venetian possessions in the territories of the archdiocese of Ravenna, after political conflicts in Italy, and banished the lagoon merchants of the Exarchate, the Venetian economy that until then had been controlled by the landowners and directed by their financial needs. The Exarchate was forced to radically renew its productive system, witnessing the intervention of new members of society or old agrarians who became shipowners, aimed mainly at maritime trade. The privileged political relations with the east also allowed the local population to gain monopoly areas, such as the trade of the so-called Tyrian purples, leather or Asian fabrics, as well as the slave market which was conducted for several centuries by the Venetians between the Slavic world and Islamic Africa. The military fleet was greatly encouraged, both by private individuals and by the local government, already from the early days of patrolling the whole Adriatic from Istria to Otranto, against piracy, reinforced by powerful ships built on the model of the Byzantine imperial dromon, called zalandriae.

== See also ==
- Venetia and Istria
- Byzantine Italy
- Timeline of the Republic of Venice
- Timeline of the city of Venice
- Patriarchate of Aquileia
- Patriarchate of Grado
- Duchy of Friuli
- History of Istria

== Bibliography ==
- Calaon, Diego (2014). "La Venetia maritima tra il VI e il IX sec. Mito, continuità e rottura" (PDF). Dalla catalogazione alla promozione dei beni archeologici. Venezia: Regione del Veneto. pp. 53–66. Archived from the original on 2025-06-13.
- Cosentino, Salvatore, ed. (2021). A Companion to Byzantine Italy. Boston-Leiden: Brill.
- Kardaras, Georgios (2018). Byzantium and the Avars, 6th-9th Century AD: Political, Diplomatic and Cultural Relations. Leiden-Boston: Brill.
- Meyendorff, John (1989). Imperial unity and Christian divisions: The Church 450-680 A.D. Crestwood, NY: St. Vladimir's Seminary Press. ISBN 978-0-88141-056-3.
- Ostrogorsky, George (1956). History of the Byzantine State. Oxford: Basil Blackwell.
- Peters, Edward; Foulke, William D., eds. (2003) [1907]. Paul the Deacon: History of the Lombards. Philadelphia: University of Pennsylvania Press.
- Ravegnani, Giorgio (2006). Bisanzio e Venezia. Bologna: Il mulino.
- Romano, Dennis (2023). Venice: The Remarkable History of the Lagoon City. New York: Oxford University Press.
- Skoblar, Magdalena, ed. (2021). Byzantium, Venice and the Medieval Adriatic: Spheres of Maritime Power and Influence, c. 700-1453. Cambridge: Cambridge University Press.
- Vicelja-Matijašić, Marina (2005). "Byzantium and Istria: Some Aspects of Byzantine Presence in Istria" (PDF). Acta Histriae. 13 (1): 185–204.
- West-Harling, Veronica (2020). Rome, Ravenna, and Venice, 750-1000: Byzantine Heritage, Imperial Present, and the Construction of City Identity. Oxford: Oxford University Press.
- Wickham, Chris (1981). Early Medieval Italy: Central Power and Local Society, 400-1000. Totowa, NJ: Barnes & Noble.
