= Byzantine Italy =

Parts of Italy held by the Byzantine Empire

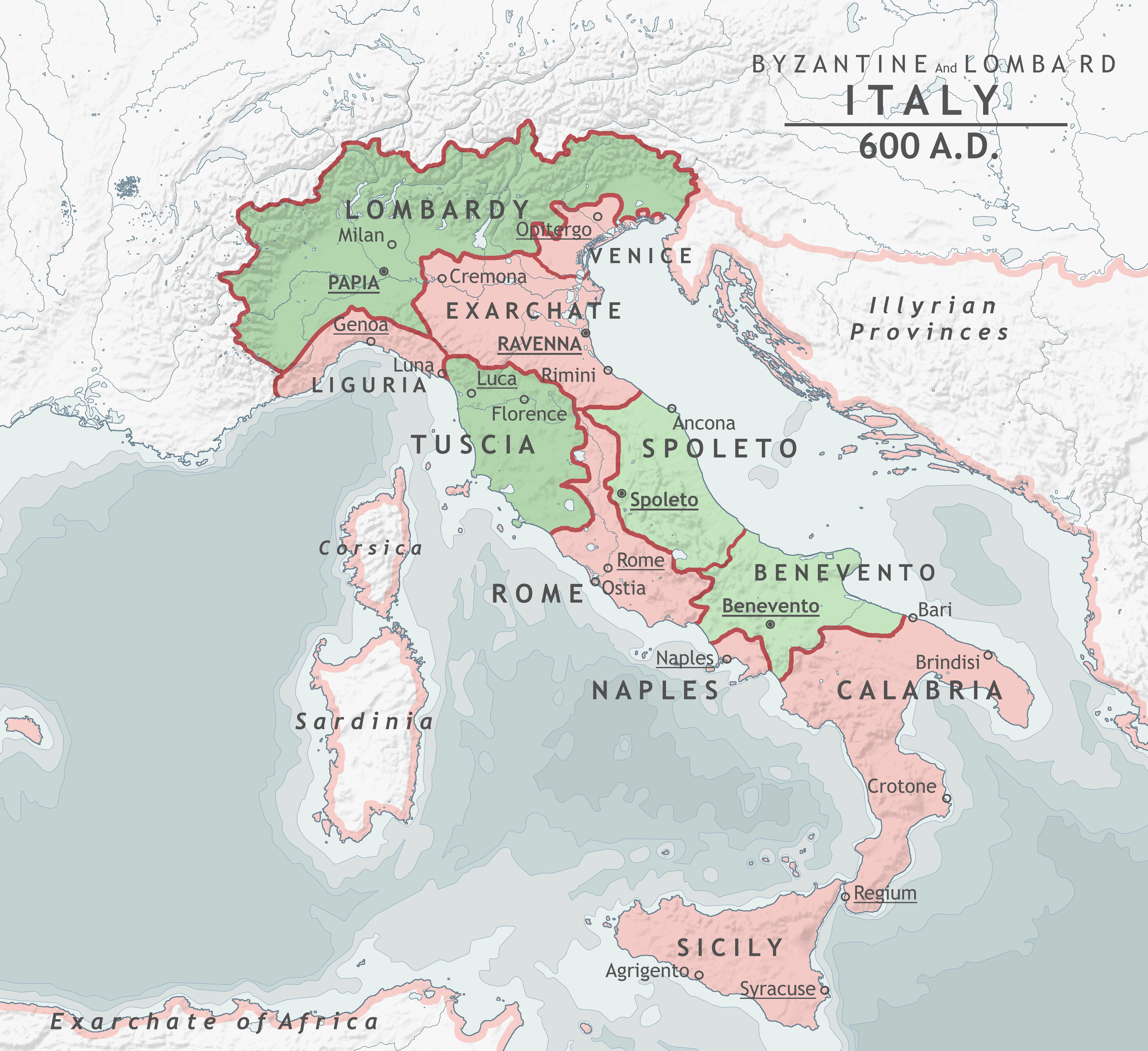
Byzantine and Lombard possessions in Italy, around 600.

Byzantine Italy consisted of various parts of the Italian Peninsula that were under the control of the Byzantine Empire after the Gothic War (535–554) and down to the end of the 11th century. The Byzantines were eventually kicked out of the Italian Peninsula entirely. There was a brief attempt at Byzantine reconquest in the middle of the 12th century.

Chronologically, it refers to:

- Praetorian prefecture of Italy (540/554–584)
- Exarchate of Ravenna (584–751)
- Theme of Longobardia (c. 891 – c. 965)
- Catepanate of Italy (965–1071)

Byzantine possessions in southern Italy, around 1000.

Several states avoided conquest by the Lombards or Franks and maintained nominal Byzantine allegiance even after the Byzantine presence in Italy came to an end:

- Byzantine Venetia (later: Republic of Venice)
- Duchy of Naples
- Duchy of Gaeta
- Duchy of Amalfi
- Duchy of Sorrento

Likewise, the islands of Sardinia and Sicily maintained Byzantine allegiance in this period:

- Theme of Sicily (687–902)
- Byzantine Sardinia

== See also ==
- Byzantine Istria
- Byzantine Dalmatia
- Byzantine North Africa
- Byzantine Spain

== Sources ==
- Calaon, Diego (2014). "La Venetia maritima tra il VI e il IX sec. Mito, continuità e rottura" (PDF). Dalla catalogazione alla promozione dei beni archeologici. Venezia: Regione del Veneto. pp. 53–66.
- Cosentino, Salvatore, ed. (2021). A Companion to Byzantine Italy. Boston-Leiden: Brill.
- Gelichi, Sauro; Gasparri, Stefano, eds. (2018). Venice and Its Neighbors from the 8th to 11th Century: Through Renovation and Continuity. Leiden-Boston: Brill.
- Kreutz, Barbara M. (1996). Before the Normans: Southern Italy in the Ninth and Tenth Centuries. Philadelphia: University of Pennsylvania Press.
- Meyendorff, John (1989). Imperial unity and Christian divisions: The Church 450-680 A.D. Crestwood, NY: St. Vladimir's Seminary Press.
- Ostrogorsky, George (1956). History of the Byzantine State. Oxford: Basil Blackwell.
- Peters, Edward; Foulke, William D., eds. (2003) [1907]. Paul the Deacon: History of the Lombards. Philadelphia: University of Pennsylvania Press.
- Ravegnani, Giorgio (2006). Bisanzio e Venezia. Bologna: Il mulino.
- Skoblar, Magdalena, ed. (2021). Byzantium, Venice and the Medieval Adriatic: Spheres of Maritime Power and Influence, c. 700-1453. Cambridge: Cambridge University Press.
- West-Harling, Veronica (2020). Rome, Ravenna, and Venice, 750-1000: Byzantine Heritage, Imperial Present, and the Construction of City Identity. Oxford: Oxford University Press.
- Vicelja-Matijašić, Marina (2005). "Byzantium and Istria: Some Aspects of Byzantine Presence in Istria" (PDF). Acta Histriae. 13 (1): 185–204.
- Wickham, Chris (1981). Early Medieval Italy: Central Power and Local Society, 400-1000. Totowa, NJ: Barnes & Noble.
