= Doge of Venice =

Chief magistrate of Venetian Republic

- Coat of arms

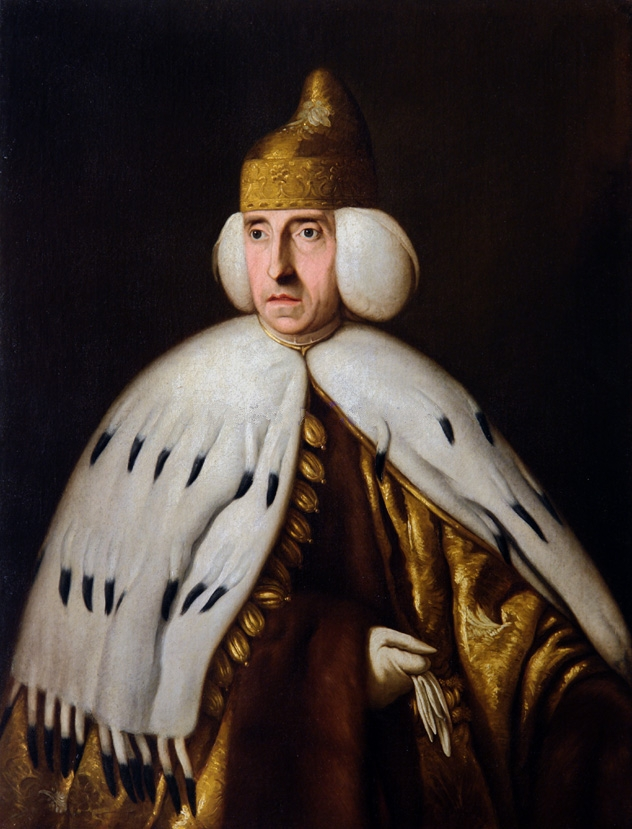
- The last doge Ludovico Manin
- Style: His Serenity
- Residence: Palazzo Ducale
- Appointer: Serenissima Signoria
- Formation: 697 (traditional); 726 (historical)
- First holder: Paolo Lucio Anafesto (traditional); Orso Ipato (historical)
- Final holder: Ludovico Manin
- Abolished: 12 May 1797
- Salary: 4,800 ducats p.a. (1582)

The doge of Venice (/doʊdʒ/ DOHJ) (Note: Venetian: Doxe de Venexia [ˈdoze de veˈnɛsja]; Italian: Doge di Venezia [ˈdɔːdʒe di veˈnɛttsja]; all derived from Latin dux, 'military leader'.) was the highest role of authority within the Republic of Venice (697–1797).

The doge of Venice acted as both the head of state and head of the Venetian oligarchy. Doges were elected for life through a complex voting process.

== History ==
=== Etymology ===
The word doge derives from the Latin dux, meaning 'leader' (cognate to English duke and Italian duce). The office and title of doge, in relation to Venetia (region) and Venice (city), emerged from older offices (Latin dux) that existed in the late Roman and early Byzantine empires. Originally referring to any military leader, it became in the Late Roman Empire the title for a leader of an expeditionary force formed by detachments (vexillationes) from the frontier army (limitanei), separate from, but subject to, the governor of a province, authorized to conduct operations beyond provincial boundaries.

=== Byzantine era ===
During the second half of the 6th and throughout the 7th century, the Byzantine province of Venetia was gradually reduced to coastal lagoons, while the hinterland was occupied by the Lombards. The remaining Byzantine regions along the coast were governed by a magister militum, subordinated to the imperial exarch of Ravenna. In 639, the provincial governor of Byzantine Venetia was magister militum Mauricius, and the same office was in the first half of the 8th century held by Marcellus, as recorded in a later document known as the Pactum Lotharii (840). Initially, the seat of local administration was situated in Oderzo, and later moved first to Eraclea (Cittanova), and then to Malamocco, to be finally settled in Rialto (Latin civitas Rivoalti, the Venice proper) since the first half of the 9th century.

The first historically attested doge was Orso Ipato, who served in the first half of the 8th century, while accounts on his alleged predecessors Paolo Lucio Anafesto and Marcello Tegalliano were created by later Venetian chronicler John the Deacon at the beginning of the 11th century, and then expanded by later chroniclers. According to modern scholars, those accounts are not considered as reliable.

In the latter half of the eighth century, Mauritius Galba was elected doge and took the title magister militum, consul et imperialis dux Veneciarum provinciae 'master of the soldiers, consul and imperial duke of the province of Venice'. Doge Justinian Partecipacius (d. 829) used the title imperialis hypatus et humilis dux provinciae Venetiarum 'imperial hypatos and humble duke of Venice'.

These early titles combined Byzantine honorifics and explicit reference to Venice's subordinate status. Titles like hypatos, spatharios, protospatharios, protosebastos and protoproedros were granted by the emperor to the recipient for life but were not inherent in the office (ἀξία διὰ βραβείου, axia dia brabeiou), but the title doux belonged to the office (ἀξία διὰ λόγου, axia dia logou). Thus, into the eleventh century the Venetian doges held titles typical of Byzantine rulers in outlying regions, such as Sardinia. As late as 1202, the Doge Enrico Dandolo was styled protosebastos, a title granted to him by Alexios III Angelos.

As Byzantine power declined in the region in the late ninth century, reference to Venice as a province disappeared in the titulature of the doges. The simple titles dux Veneticorum (duke of the Venetians) and dux Venetiarum (duke of the Venetias) predominate in the tenth century. The plural reflects the doge's rule of several federated townships and clans.

=== Dukes of Dalmatia and Croatia ===
After defeating Croatia and conquering some Dalmatian territory in 1000, Doge Pietro II Orseolo adopted the title dux Dalmatiae, 'Duke of Dalmatia', or in its fuller form, Veneticorum atque Dalmaticorum dux, 'Duke of the Venetians and Dalmatians'.

This title was recognised by the Holy Roman Emperor Henry II in 1002. After a Venetian request, it was confirmed by the Byzantine emperor Alexios I Komnenos in 1082. In a chrysobull dated that year, Alexios granted the Venetian doge the imperial title of protosebastos, and recognised him as imperial doux over the Dalmatian theme.

The expression Dei gratia ('by the grace of God') was adopted consistently by the Venetian chancery only in the course of the eleventh century. An early example, however, can be found in 827–29, during the joint reign of Justinian and his brother John I: per divinam gratiam Veneticorum provinciae duces, 'by divine grace dukes of the Venetian provinces'.

Between 1091 and 1102, the King of Hungary acquired the Croatian kingdom in a personal union. In these circumstances, the Venetians appealed to the Byzantine emperor for recognition of their title to Croatia (like Dalmatia, a former Byzantine subject). Perhaps as early as the reign of Vital Falier (d. 1095), and certainly by that of Vital Michiel (d. 1102), the title dux Croatiae had been added, giving the full dogal title four parts: dux Venetiae atque Dalmatiae sive Chroaciae et imperialis prothosevastos, 'Duke of Venice, Dalmatia and Croatia and Imperial Protosebastos'. In the fourteenth century, the doges periodically objected to the use of Dalmatia and Croatia in the Hungarian king's titulature, regardless of their own territorial rights or claims. Later medieval chronicles mistakenly attributed the acquisition of the Croatian title to Doge Ordelaf Falier (d. 1117).

According to the Venetiarum Historia, written around 1350, Doge Domenico Morosini added atque Ystrie dominator ('and lord of Istria') to his title after forcing Pula on Istria to submit in 1150. Only one charter, however, actually uses a title similar to this: et totius Ystrie inclito dominatori (1153).

=== Post-1204 ===
The next major change in the dogal title came with the Fourth Crusade, which conquered the Byzantine Empire (1204). The Byzantine honorific protosebastos had by this time been dropped and was replaced by a reference to Venice's allotment in the partitioning of the Byzantine Empire. The new full title was 'By the grace of God duke of the Venices, Dalmatia and Croatia and lord of a fourth part and a half [three eighths] of the whole Empire of Romania' (Dei gratia dux Venecie [or Venetiarum] Dalmatiae atque Chroatiae, dominus [or dominator] quartae partis et dimidie totius imperii Romaniae).

Although traditionally ascribed by later medieval chroniclers to Doge Enrico Dandolo, who led the Venetians during the Fourth Crusade, and hence known as the arma Dandola, in reality the title of 'lord of a fourth part and a half of the Empire of Romania' was first claimed by the ambitious Venetian podestà of Constantinople, Marino Zeno, in his capacity as the Doge's representative in the 'Empire of Romania', and it was only subsequently adopted as part of the dogal title by Doge Pietro Ziani.

The Greek chronicler George Akropolites used the term despotes to translate dominus, 'lord', which has led to some confusion with the Byzantine court title of despot. The latter title was never claimed by the doges, but was sometimes used by the Venetian podestàs of Constantinople in their capacity as the doge's representatives.

The title of 'lord of a fourth part and a half of the whole Empire of Romania' was used in official titulature thereafter, with the exception, after the re-establishment in 1261 of the Byzantine Empire under the Palaiologos dynasty, of Venice's relations with the Byzantine emperors, when that part of the dogal titulature was substituted by 'and lord of the lands and islands subject to his dogate' (dominus terrarum et insularum suo ducatui subiectarum) or similar formulations.

In a similar manner, the disputes between Venice and Hungary over Dalmatia and Croatia led to the kings of Hungary addressing the doges of Venice without that part of their title, while in turn the Venetians tried to force the Hungarian kings to drop any title laying claim to the two provinces.

This dispute ended in the Treaty of Zadar of 1358, where Venice renounced its claims to Dalmatia; a special article in the treaty removed Dalmatia and Croatia from the doge's title. The resulting title was Dux Veneciarum et cetera, 'Duke of the Venices and the rest'. Even though Dalmatia would be regained by Venice in the early 15th century, the title was never modified, and remained in use until the end of the Republic. Even when the body of such documents was written in Italian, the title and dating clause were in Latin.

== Selection of the doge ==
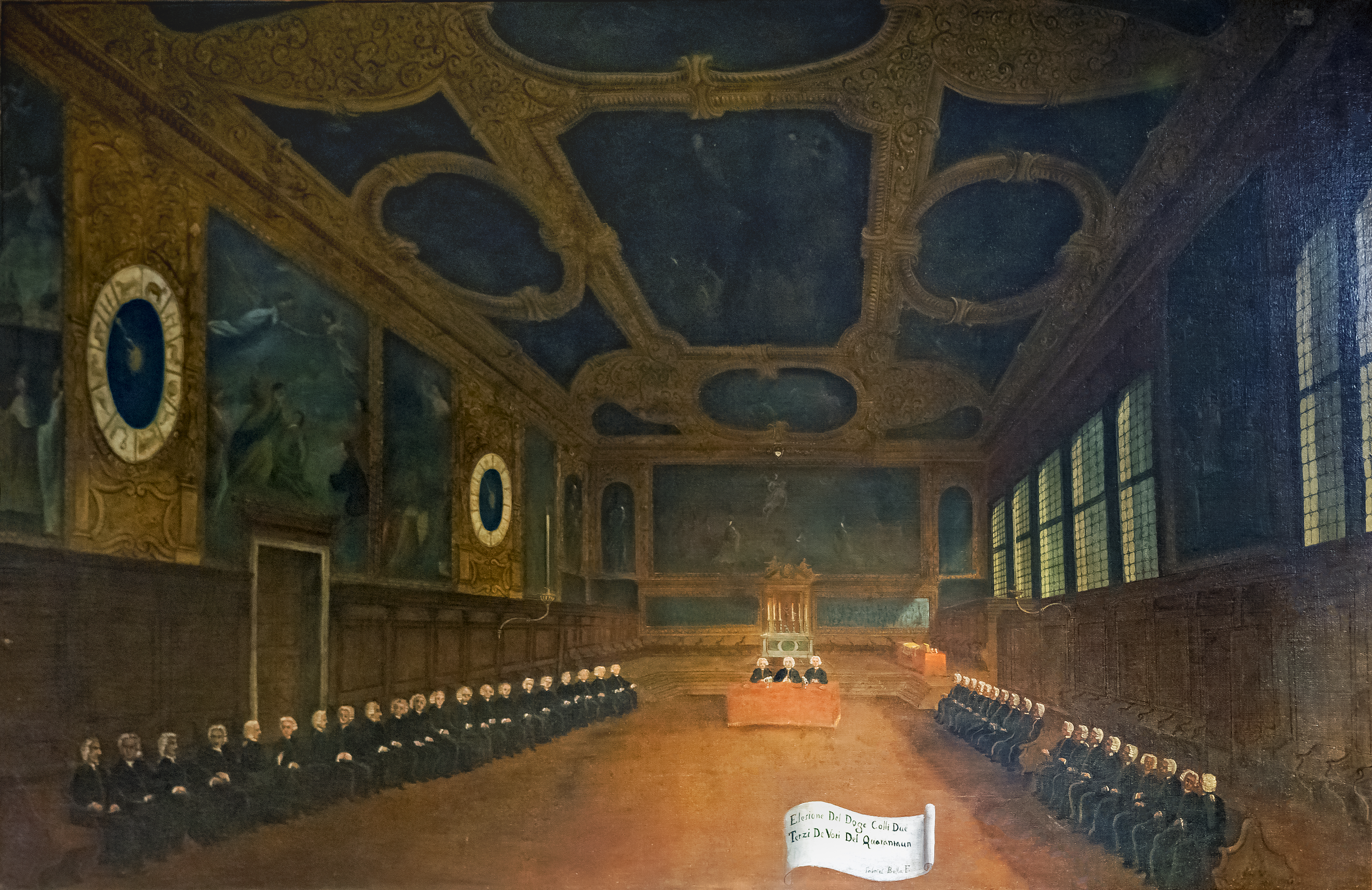
Election of the Doge by the Forty-One – Gabriele Bella

The doge's prerogatives were not precisely defined. While the position was entrusted to members of the inner circle of powerful Venetian families, several doges had associated a son with themselves in the ducal office. This tendency towards hereditary rule was checked by a law that decreed that no doge had the right to associate any member of his family with himself in his office, nor to name his successor.

After 1172, the election of the doge was entrusted to a committee of forty, who were chosen by four men selected from the Great Council of Venice, which was itself nominated annually by twelve persons. After a deadlocked tie at the election of 1229, the number of electors was increased from forty to forty-one.

New regulations for the elections of the doge introduced in 1268 remained in force until the end of the republic in 1797. Their intention was to minimize the influence of individual great families, and this was effected by a complex electoral machinery. Thirty members of the Great Council, chosen by lot, were reduced by lot to nine; the nine chose forty and the forty were reduced by lot to twelve, who chose twenty-five. The twenty-five were reduced by lot to nine, and the nine elected forty-five. These forty-five were once more reduced by lot to eleven, and the eleven finally chose the forty-one who elected the doge.

Election required at least twenty-five votes out of forty-one, nine votes out of eleven or twelve, or seven votes out of nine electors. (Note: A detailed description of this process, and the ceremonial procession that followed, is preserved in Martin da Canal's work Les Estoires de Venise (English translation by Laura K. Morreale, Padua 2009, pp. 103–116))

Before taking the oath of investiture, the doge-elect was presented to the concio with the words: "This is your doge, if it please you." This ceremonial gesture signified the assent of the Venetian people. This practice came to an end with the abolition of the concio in 1423; after the election of Francesco Foscari, he was presented with the unconditional pronouncement, "Your doge".

== Regulations ==
The Doge's Palace complex.

While doges had great temporal power at first, after 1268, the doge was constantly under strict surveillance: he had to wait for other officials to be present before opening dispatches from foreign powers; he was not allowed to possess any property in a foreign land.

The doges normally ruled for life (although a few were forcibly removed from office). After a doge's death, a commission of inquisitori passed judgment upon his acts, and his estate was liable to be fined for any discovered malfeasance. The official income of the doge was never large, and from early times holders of the office remained engaged in trading ventures. These ventures kept them in touch with the requirements of the grandi.

From 7 July 1268, during a vacancy in the office of doge, the state was headed ex officio, with the style vicedoge, by the senior consigliere ducale (ducal counsellor).

== Ritual role ==
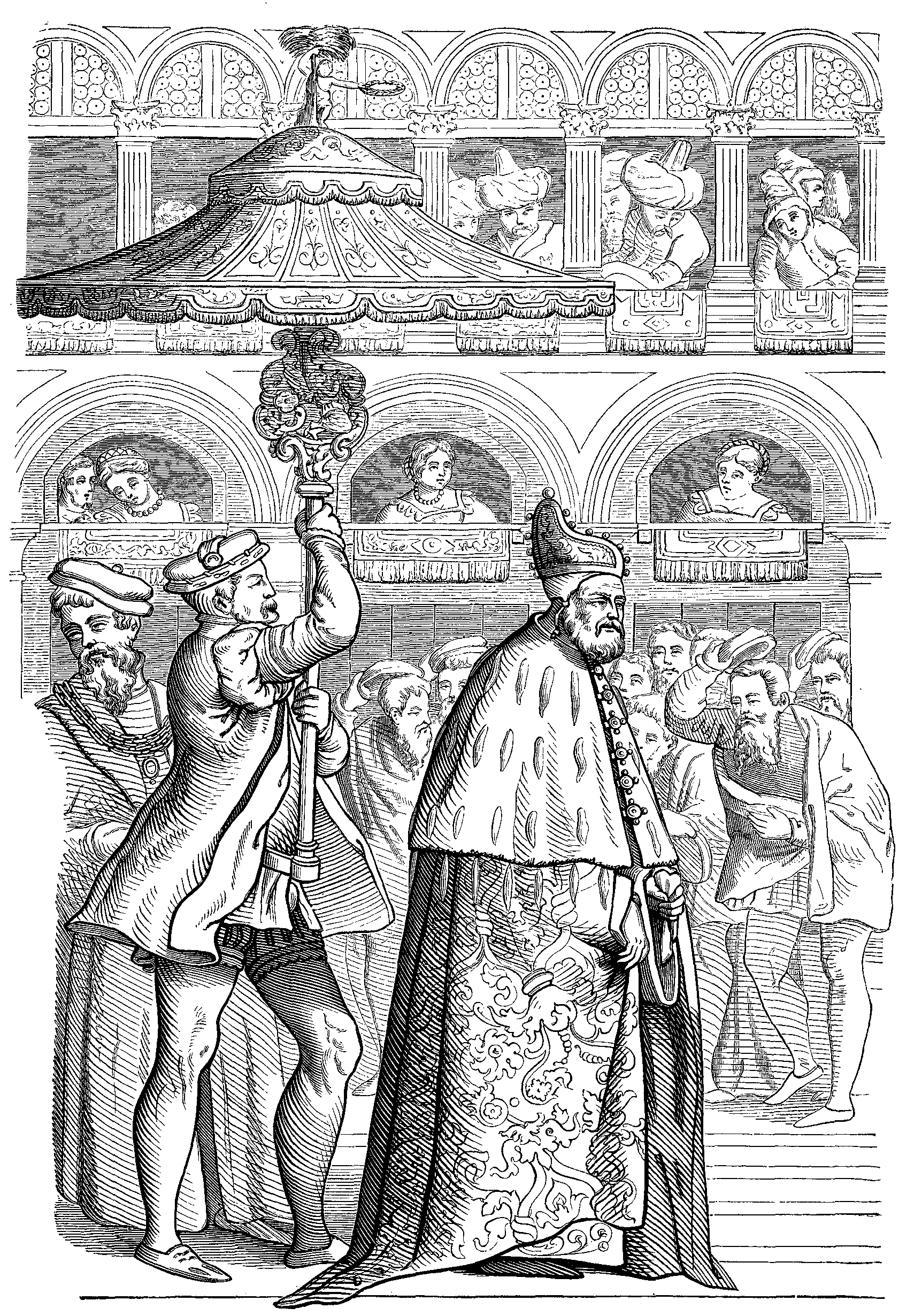
Grand Procession of the Doge, 16th century

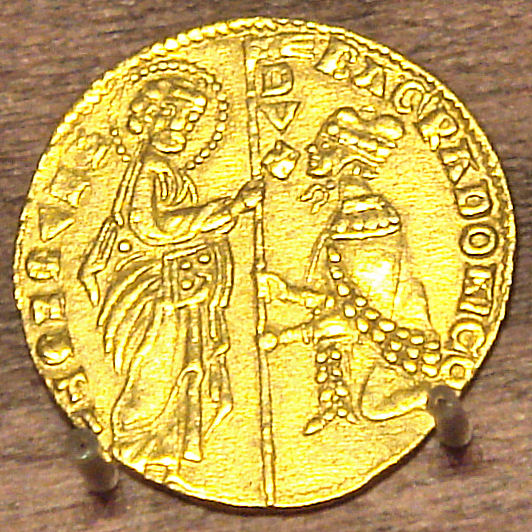
Gold coin of Bartolomeo Gradenigo (1260–1342): the Doge kneeling before St. Mark.

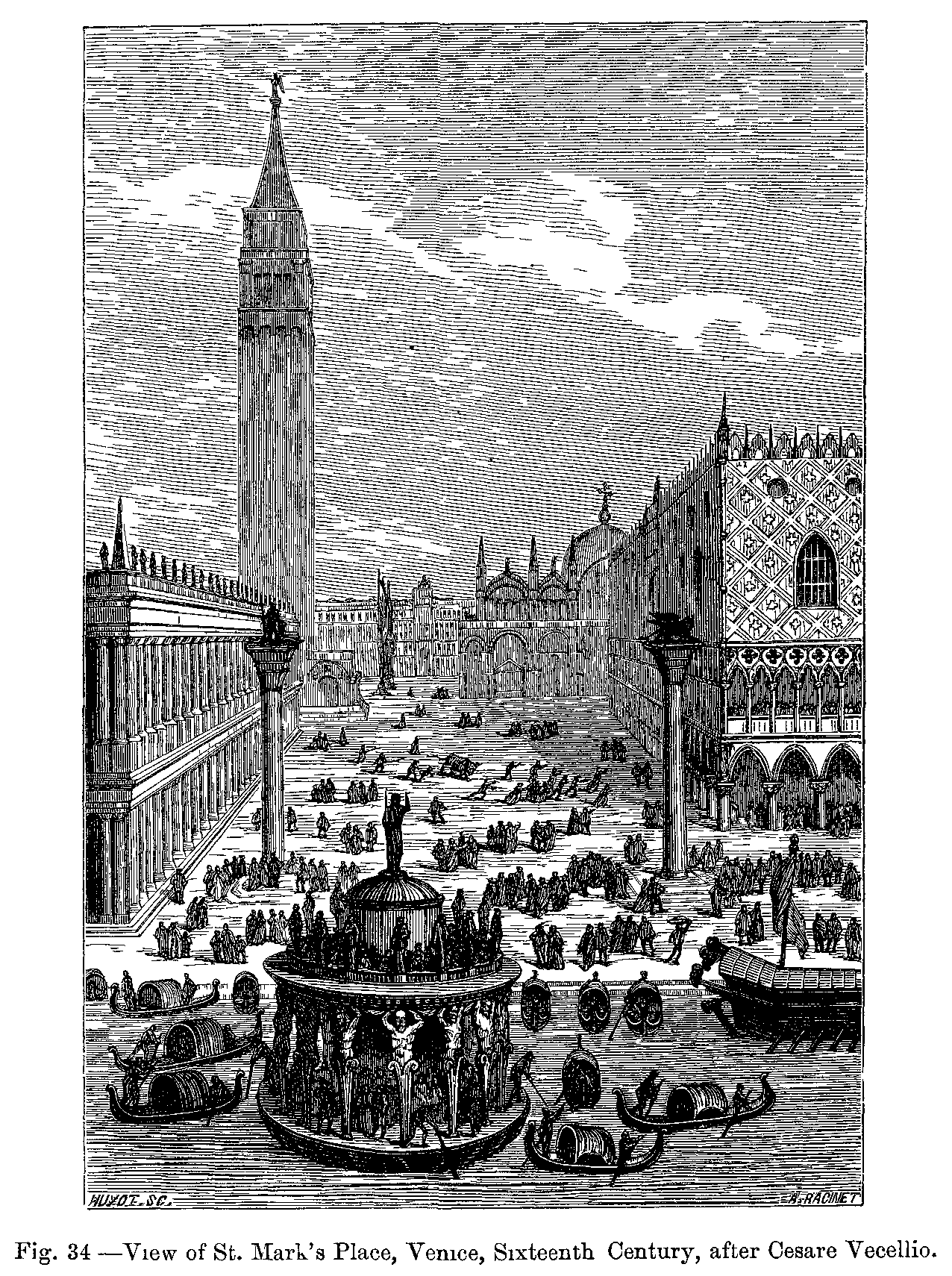
View of the Piazzetta in the 16th century, after Cesare Vecellio

The Return of the Bucentaur to the Molo on Ascension Day (1730 by Canaletto)

One of the ceremonial duties of the doge was to celebrate the symbolic marriage of Venice with the sea. This was done by casting a ring from the state barge, the Bucentaur, into the Adriatic. In its earlier form this ceremony was instituted to commemorate the conquest of Dalmatia by Doge Pietro II Orseolo in 1000, and was celebrated on Ascension Day. It took its later and more magnificent form after the visit to Venice in 1177 of Pope Alexander III and the Holy Roman Emperor Frederick I. On state occasions the doge was surrounded by an increasing amount of ceremony, and in international relations he had the status of a sovereign prince.

The doge took part in ducal processions, which started in the Piazza San Marco. The doge would appear in the center of the procession, preceded by civil servants ranked in ascending order of prestige and followed by noble magistrates ranked in descending order of status. Francesco Sansovino described such a procession in minute detail in 1581. His description is confirmed and complemented by Cesare Vecellio's 1586 painting of a ducal procession in the Piazza San Marco.

== Regalia ==
From the 14th century onward, the ceremonial crown and well-known symbol of the doge of Venice was called corno ducale, a unique ducal hat. It was a stiff horn-like bonnet, which was made of gemmed brocade or cloth-of-gold and worn over the camauro. This was a fine linen cap with a structured peak reminiscent of the Phrygian cap, a classical symbol of liberty. This ceremonial cap may have been ultimately based on the white crown of Upper Egypt. Every Easter Monday the doge headed a procession from San Marco to the convent of San Zaccaria, where the abbess presented him a new camauro crafted by the nuns.

The Doge's official costume also included golden robes, slippers and a sceptre for ceremonial duties.

== Death and burial ==
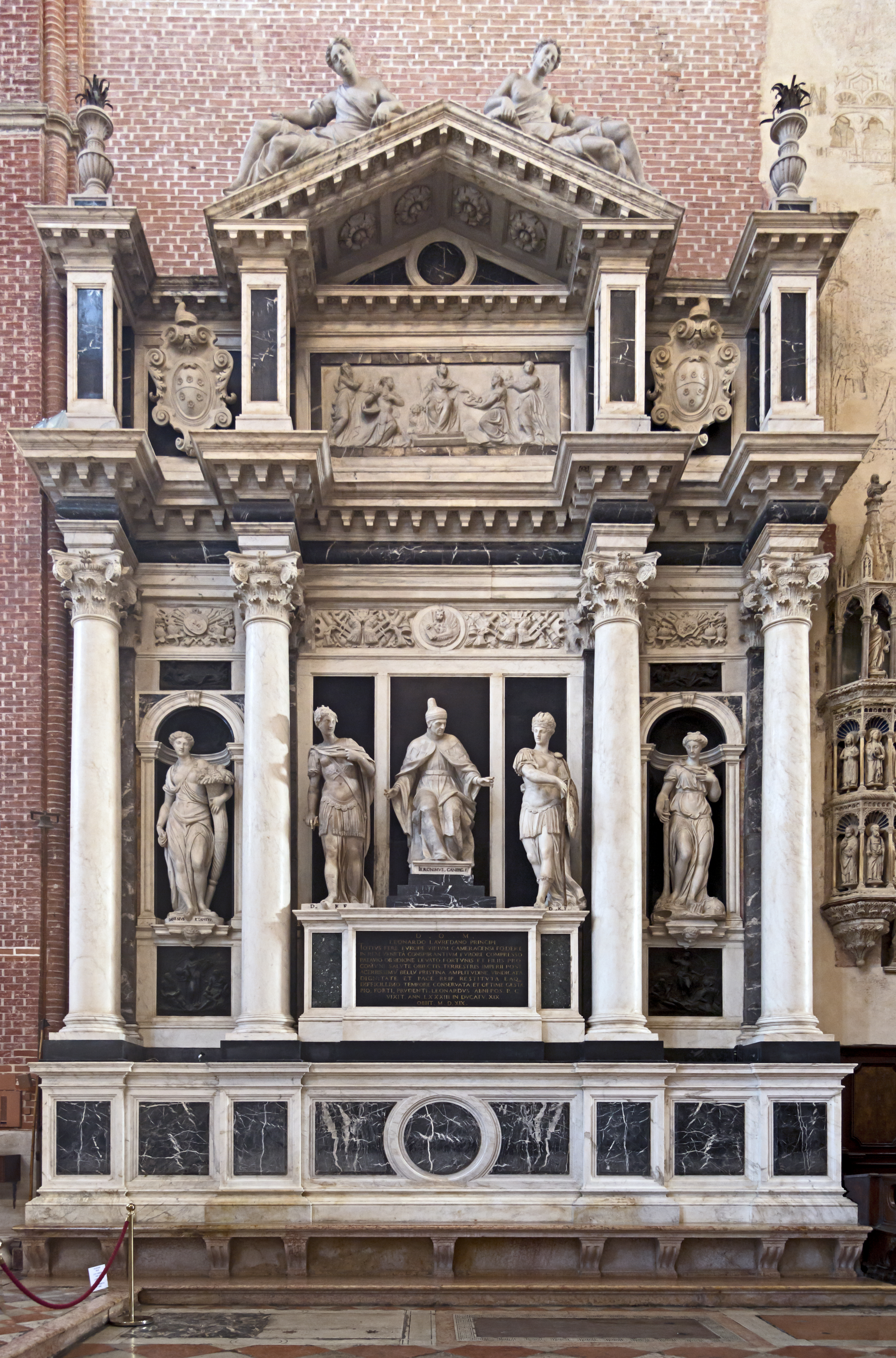
Tomb of Doge Leonardo Loredan in the Basilica of Santi Giovanni e Paolo.

Until the 15th century, the funeral service for a deceased doge would normally be held at St Mark's Basilica, where some early holders of this office are also buried. After the 15th century, however, the funerals of all later doges were held at the Basilica di San Giovanni e Paolo. Twenty-five doges are buried there.

== Decline of the office ==
As the oligarchical element in the constitution developed, the more important functions of the ducal office were assigned to other officials, or to administrative boards. The doge's role became a mostly representative position. The last doge was Ludovico Manin, who abdicated in 1797 following Napoleon's conquest of the city.

While Venice declared itself soon again a republic, attempting to resist annexation by Austria, it would never revive the title of doge. It used various titles, including dictator, and collective heads of state to govern the jurisdiction, including a triumvirate.

== See also ==
- List of doges of Venice
- History of the Republic of Venice
- Timeline of the Republic of Venice
- Timeline of the city of Venice
- Signoria of Venice
- Senarica
- Sortition
- Doge of Genoa

== Sources ==
- Fine, John Van Antwerp Jr. (2006). When Ethnicity did not Matter in the Balkans: A Study of Identity in Pre-Nationalist Croatia, Dalmatia, and Slavonia in the Medieval and Early-Modern Periods. Ann Arbor, MI: University of Michigan Press.
- Gasparri, Stefano (2015). "The formation of an early medieval community: Venice between provincial and urban identity". Three empires, three cities: Identity, material culture and legitimacy in Venice, Ravenna and Rome, 750-1000. Brepols: Turnhout. pp. 35–50.
- Gasparri, Stefano (2018). "The First Dukes and the Origins of Venice". Venice and Its Neighbors from the 8th to 11th Century: Through Renovation and Continuity. Leiden-Boston: Brill. pp. 5–26.
- Gasparri, Stefano (2021). "The Origins of Venice: Between Italy, Byzantium and the Adriatic". Byzantium, Venice and the Medieval Adriatic: Spheres of Maritime Power and Influence, c. 700-1453. Cambridge: Cambridge University Press. pp. 98–110.
- Gelichi, Sauro (2021a). "The Northern Adriatic Area between the Eighth and the Ninth Century: New Landscapes, New Cities". Byzantium, Venice and the Medieval Adriatic: Spheres of Maritime Power and Influence, c. 700-1453. Cambridge: Cambridge University Press. pp. 111–132.
- Gelichi, Sauro (2021b). "The Venetiae, the Exarchate and the Pentapolis". A Companion to Byzantine Italy. Boston-Leiden: Brill. pp. 360–386.
- Marin, Şerban (2004). "Dominus quartae partis et dimidiae totius imperii Romaniae: The Fourth Crusade and the Dogal Title in the Venetian Chronicles' Representation". Quaderni della Casa Romena di Venezia. 3: 119–150.
- Nicol, Donald M. (1992) [1988]. Byzantium and Venice: A Study in Diplomatic and Cultural Relations (2. ed.). Cambridge: Cambridge University Press.
- Norwich, John J. (1982). A History of Venice. New York: Knopf.
- Pazienza, Annamaria (2018). "Archival Documents as Narrative: The Sources of the Istoria Veneticorum and the Plea of Rižana". Venice and Its Neighbors from the 8th to 11th Century: Through Renovation and Continuity. Leiden-Boston: Brill. pp. 27–50.
- A dramatic account of the ceremonies and procedures that accompanied the election of a doge is to be found in the Estoires de Venise of Martino da Canal (an English translation was published by Laura K. Morreale, Padua, UniPress 2009).
