= 1229 Venetian doge election =

1229 election of the Doge of Venice

- 6 March 1229

40 electors 21 votes needed to win
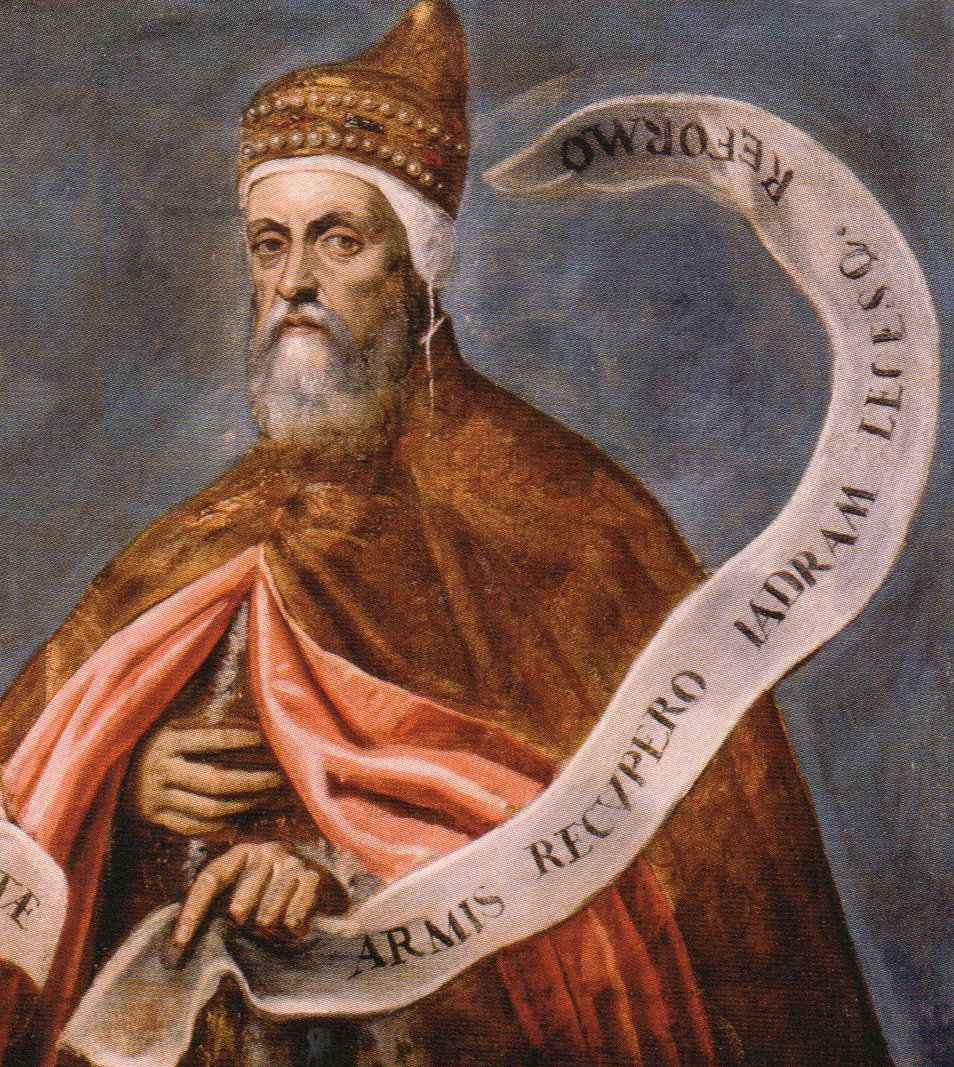
Candidate	Jacopo Tiepolo	Marino Dandolo
Electoral vote	20 (won by lot)	20
Percentage	50%	50%
Doge before election
Pietro Ziani
Elected doge
Jacopo Tiepolo

The 1229 Venetian doge election took place on 6 March 1229, to elect the new Doge of Venice following the abdication of Pietro Ziani. The election resulted in an exact tie between the two candidates, Jacopo Tiepolo and Marino Dandolo. The deadlock was broken by drawing lots, resulting in a victory for Tiepolo.

== Background ==
In February 1229, Doge Pietro Ziani abdicated the ducal throne. His departure highlighted a growing divide within the Venetian ruling class. The two candidates who emerged represented different backgrounds within the patriciate.

Marino Dandolo was a member of the old, established aristocratic families of Venice. His opponent, Jacopo Tiepolo, came from a family engaged in trade. Unlike his ancestors, who had been merchants but uninvolved in Venetian politics, Tiepolo's social rise was coupled with increasing participation in politics. He had served as a judge, the first Duke of Crete, twice as Podestà of Constantinople, and multiple times as a diplomat and governor.

== Election ==
At the time of the 1229 election, the Venetian electoral college consisted of forty electors. On 6 March 1229, the electors cast their ballots, resulting in a perfect stalemate. Tiepolo and his rival Dandolo received twenty votes each. With no mechanism in place to resolve a tied vote, the electors resorted to drawing lots to determine the next Doge, leading to Tiepolo's victory.

=== Voting summary ===
1229 Venetian Doge Election Results
Candidate	Votes	%	Tie-breaker
Jacopo Tiepolo	20	50%	Won by lot
Marino Dandolo	20	50%	Eliminated
Total Electors	40	100%	

== Aftermath ==
The immediate result of the tie-breaker was a lasting feud between the Dandolo, who were an old aristocratic family, and the Tiepolo, who were seen as nouveau-riches.

Prior to ascending the ducal throne, Tiepolo had to sign a traditional promissione ducale, seriously limiting his powers. In an attempt to prevent the recurrence of a split vote in future elections, the number of electors was increased from forty to forty-one.

During his dogate, Tiepolo promulgated new laws on commerce (1219), criminal law (1232), and codified civil law in the 1242 Statutum novum. He greatly expanded the ruling class of the Republic, extending the voting right to the merchant class, from which he himself had come. The Great Council of Venice increased in importance under his rule, and the Venetian Senate was established.

== Sources ==
- Jacoby, David (2006). "The Venetian Government and Administration in Latin Constantinople, 1204–1261: A State within a State". In Gherardo Ortalli; Giorgio Ravegnani; Peter Schreiner (eds.). Quarta Crociata. Venezia - Bisanzio - Impero latino. Atti delle giornate di studio. Venezia, 4-8 maggio 2004. Venice: Istituto veneto di scienze, lettere ed arti. pp. 19–79. ISBN 978-8-8881-4374-3.
- Pozza, Marco (2019). "TIEPOLO, Giacomo". Dizionario Biografico degli Italiani (in Italian). Vol. 95: Taranto–Togni. Rome: Istituto dell'Enciclopedia Italiana. ISBN 978-88-12-00032-6.
