= Dogado =

Central territory of the Republic of Venice

Duchy of Venice Dogado (vec)
- Domain of the Republic of Venice
- 697–1797
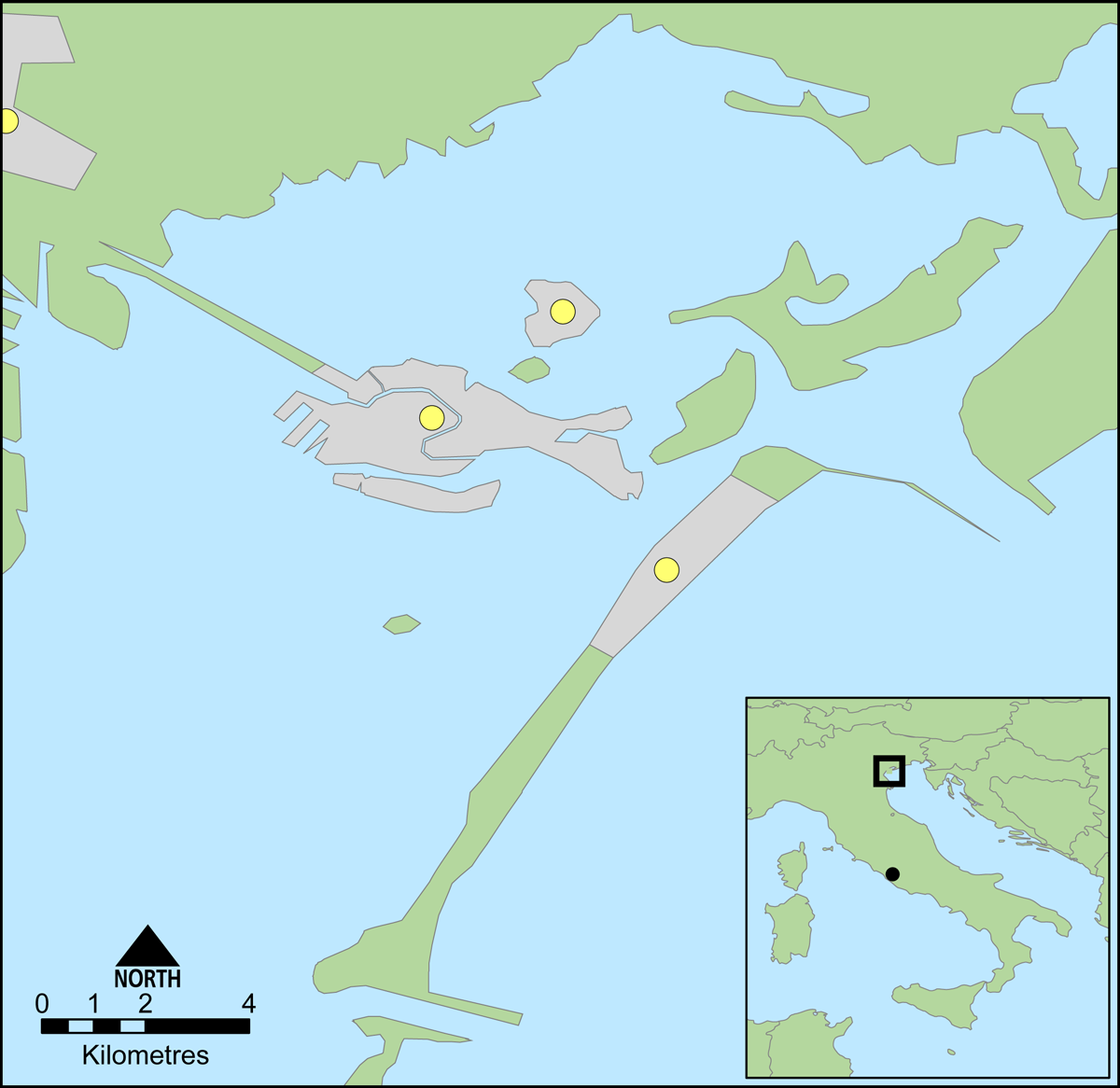
- The Venetian Lagoon, with Mestre marked on the mainland, then (north to south) Murano, Venice and the Lido in the lagoon
- Historical era: Middle Ages, Early modern period
  - Traditional date of establishment: 697
  - Fall of the Republic of Venice: 16 May 1797
Preceded by	Succeeded by
Byzantine Venetia	Provisional Municipality of Venice
- Today part of: Italy

The Dogado, or the Duchy of Venice, was the metropolitan territory of the Republic of Venice, headed by the Doge, traditionally from 697, and up to 1797. It comprised the city of Venice and the narrow coastal strip from Loreo to Grado, though these borders later extended from Goro to the south, the Polesine and the Padovano to the west, the Trevisano and Friuli to the north and the mouth of the Isonzo to the east.

Apart from Venice, the capital and in practice a city-state of its own, the Dogado was subdivided in nine districts starting at the north: Grado, Caorle, Torcello, Murano, Malamocco, Chioggia, Loreo, Cavarzere and Gambarare (in Mira). In lieu of the earlier tribunes (elected by the people) and gastalds (corresponding with the Doge), during the Republic each district was led by a patrician with the title of podestà, with the exception of Grado, headed by a Count.

It was one of the three subdivisions of the Republic's possessions, the other two being the Stato da Màr (lit. 'State of the Sea'), i.e. Venice's overseas colonies, and the Stato da Terra (lit. 'State of the Land'), i.e. Venice's domains in mainland Italy, the strategic and economic hinterland of the Dogado.

Dogado was the equivalent of Ducato (duchy), the Italian city states that (unlike Venice) had a duke as hereditary head of state.

== See also ==
- Venetia and Istria
- Byzantine Venetia
- Republic of Venice
- Patriarchate of Grado

== Sources ==
- Cosentino, Salvatore, ed. (2021). A Companion to Byzantine Italy. Boston-Leiden: Brill.
- Peters, Edward; Foulke, William D., eds. (2003) [1907]. Paul the Deacon: History of the Lombards. Philadelphia: University of Pennsylvania Press.
- Ravegnani, Giorgio (2006). Bisanzio e Venezia. Bologna: Il mulino.
- Skoblar, Magdalena, ed. (2021). Byzantium, Venice and the Medieval Adriatic: Spheres of Maritime Power and Influence, c. 700-1453. Cambridge: Cambridge University Press.
- Wickham, Chris (1981). Early Medieval Italy: Central Power and Local Society, 400-1000. Totowa, NJ: Barnes & Noble.
