= Cittanova, Veneto =

Place in Italy

Cittanova Zitanova
- Interactive map of Cittanova
- Coordinates: 45°38′18″N 12°39′31″E
- Country: Italy
- Region: Veneto
- Metropolitan city: Venice

Population
  - Total: 36
- Area code: 0421

Cittanova (Venetian: Zitanova, /tsita'nɔva/) is a place in the Italian Metropolitan City of Venice.

It is divided between the municipalities of San Donà di Piave (which considers it as a hamlet, frazione) and Eraclea (which classifies it as a locality, località). The border between the two municipalities is marked by the Ramo canal.

The current town, which was built after the works of bonifica completed in the twentieth century, is the heir of a much older center, one of the most important in the medieval Venetian Lagoon.

== History ==
Cittanova was founded at the beginning of the 9th century as Civitas Nova Heracliana (New City of Eraclea) on the ruins of ancient Heraclia, destroyed during the clashes between the rival factions of the pro-Franks and the pro-Byzantines (804) and then by Pepin (810). The initiative came from the Doge Agnello Participazio, of a Heracleense family, who had a holiday palace built there.

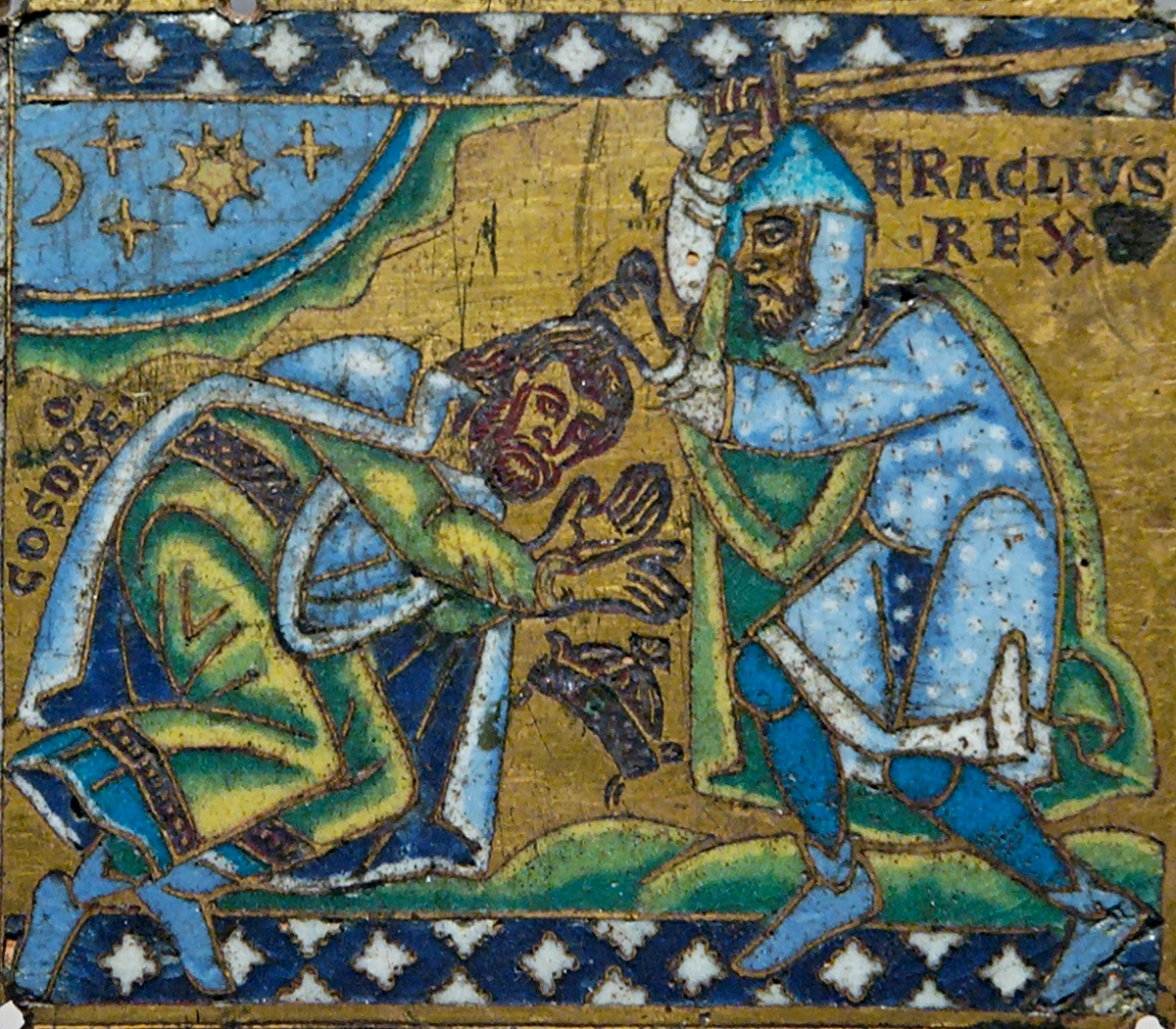
Byzantine depiction of emperor Heraclius cutting off the head of the Sassanid shah Khosrow II; Melidissa was renamed "Eraclea" in his honor.

The end of the settlement came with the great flood of 1110, when the Piave changed its course, ending up flowing into the Cavallino and transforming the lands of Cittanova into a malarial swamp. In a short time, nothing remained of the ancient city, except the cathedral of San Pietro, periodically visited on the occasion of religious solemnities by the bishop, otherwise residing in Venice or in one of the nearby monasteries. The diocese was finally suppressed in 1440 and aggregated to the patriarchate of Grado. San Donà passed from the diocese of Cittanova to that of Treviso in 1334.

Between 1543 and 1664 the area was affected by the impressive hydraulic works ordered by the Republic of Venice to avoid the swamping of its lagoon. The Piave was diverted and led to flow into a vast artificial freshwater lake near Cittanova called Lago della Piave, where today there are the hamlets of Passarella and Palazzetto. The situation seemed ideal to favor the flourishing of the area, but not even twenty years later another flood pushed the river to assume its current course and it was necessary to wait till the end of the First World War for the bonifica of Eraclea (the Bonifica di Eraclea) to take place.

== Today ==
Today, Cittanova is a purely agricultural town. The current church of the hamlet was built in 1927 on the land donated by the engineer Francesco Velluti, as mentioned in a plaque affixed to the wall of the church in 1940. In 1954 the Patriarch of Venice Angelo Roncalli (the future Pope John XXIII) made Cittanova a parish of the vicariate of Eraclea. The first parish priest was Don Giovanni Bessegato, former chaplain of the Cathedral of San Donà.

Recent aerial photographs have confirmed that the city extended over the islands of the laguna opitergina located between the current localities of Fiorentina, Fossà, Staffolo and Stretti.
