= Chronicon Venetum et Gradense =

Venetian chronicle compiled by John the Deacon

The Chronicon Venetum et Gradense, formerly known as the Chronicon Sagornini, is a Venetian chronicle compiled by John the Deacon in ca. 1008. It is the oldest chronicle of the Republic of Venice. John was the chaplain and perhaps a relative of Venetian Doge Pietro II Orseolo (r. 991–1009). The first part, dealing with early history, is lacking, only later becoming more accurate, and in the time of John himself deemed particularly valuable. It details the reign of Pietro II.

== Sources ==
- Herbermann, Charles George (1950). The Catholic Encyclopedia. Appleton. p. 491.
