= Edward Peters (scholar) =

American historian (1936–2024)

Edward Murray Peters (May 21, 1936 – November 4, 2024) was an American emeritus professor of University of Pennsylvania who specialized in the religious and political history of early Europe. He conducted in-depth research regarding heresy, repression and the limits and treatment of intellectual inquiry in the low Middle Ages. He also did deep research on historiography criticising, improving, and reviewing the methods that traditional historiography has applied to the low medieval time period. He received a bachelor's, master's, and the first Ph.D. in Medieval Studies from Yale University. After arriving at Penn in 1968, he served as a history professor and curator of the Henry Charles Lea Library at Penn Libraries, a position he held for 41 years.

Peters received fellowships from the American Council of Learned Societies, the American Philosophical Society, the John Simon Guggenheim Foundation, and the honor most meaningful to him, being made a fellow of the Medieval Academy of America.

Peters died on November 4, 2024, at the age of 88.

== Publications ==
- Europe and the Middle Ages, Pearson, 2003
- Witchcraft in Europe, 400-1700: A Documentary History, University of Pennsylvania Press, 2000
- The First Crusade: "The Chronicle of Fulcher of Chartres" and Other Source Materials, University of Pennsylvania Press, 1998
- Torture, University of Pennsylvania Press, 1996
- Inquisition, University of California Press, 1989
- Heresy and Authority in Medieval Europe, University of California Press, 1980
- The Magician, the Witch, and the Law, University of Pennsylvania Press, 1978
- Monks, Bishops and Pagans: Christian Culture in Gaul and Italy, 500–700. University of Pennsylvania Press, 1975.
- Christian Society and the Crusades, 1198-1229: Sources in Translation, including "The Capture of Damietta" by Oliver of Paderborn, University of Pennsylvania Press, 1971
