= John the Deacon (Venetian chronicler) =

Venetian deacon

John the Deacon (Italian: Giovanni Diacono or Giovanni da Venezia; c. 940–45 – died after 1018) was a Venetian deacon, secretary to the doge of Venice and a chronicler.

== The Venetian chronicle ==
According to the Catholic Encyclopedia (1913):

The oldest chronicle of Venice, known as the Chronicon Sagornini, was compiled by deacon John, the chaplain and perhaps a relative of the Doge Pietro II Orseolo (991–1009). John enjoyed the confidence of this doge, and was often sent as his ambassador to Holy Roman Emperors Otto III and Henry II. In the first part of his chronicle, which deals with the early period of the republic, the narrative is often confused and deficient; later it becomes more accurate and complete, and for the time in which the writer himself lived it is particularly valuable. He carries the narrative to 1008 and treats in detail of the reign of Pietro Orseolo.

John's chronicle is a key primary source for the history of Slavic peoples and polities in Dalmatia during the 9th and 10th centuries, for which he probably drew on earlier documents. He distinguishes between the Narentines, who lived about the mouth of the Neretva River, and another, more northerly group that would give rise to the principality of Croatia and later still, the kingdom of Croatia. John reports on the troublesome dealings of Doge John (829–836) and his successor Peter (836–864) with the Neretva Slavs; the Pactum Lotharii of 840 and the Venetian-Frankish alliance against Slavic piracy; Domagoj and the wars about the Istrian region; the coup of the Slavic principality by Zdeslav; the usurper Branimir; and naval warfare against the Narentine Slavs in 887 and 948. For his own time, John reports on the successes of his master, Doge Peter (II) Orseolo (991–1009), against the "Slav Croats", his clashes with both Croats and Narentines over the possession of Zadar, and the submission of Dalmatian rulers (except the "king of the Croats") to Venice.

John has also been erroneously credited with the Chronicon Gradense, which is in the manuscripts usually given with Chronicon Venetum.

== Editions ==
- Berto, L. A., ed. (1999). Giovanni Diacono, Istoria Veneticorum. Bologna: Zanichelli.
- Monticolo, G., ed. (1890). Cronache Veneziane antichissime I. Fonti per la storia d' Italia 9. Rome: Forzani. pp. 59–171.
- Pertz, G. H., ed. (1846). Monumenta Germaniae Historica: Scriptores 7. Hanover. pp. 1–36.
