= Kingdom of the Morea =

Colony of the Republic of Venice on the Peloponnese Peninsula (1688–1715)

Kingdom of the Morea Regno di Morea Regno de Morea Βασίλειο του Μορέως
- Colony of the Republic of Venice
- 1688–1715
- Coat of arms of the Regno di Morea

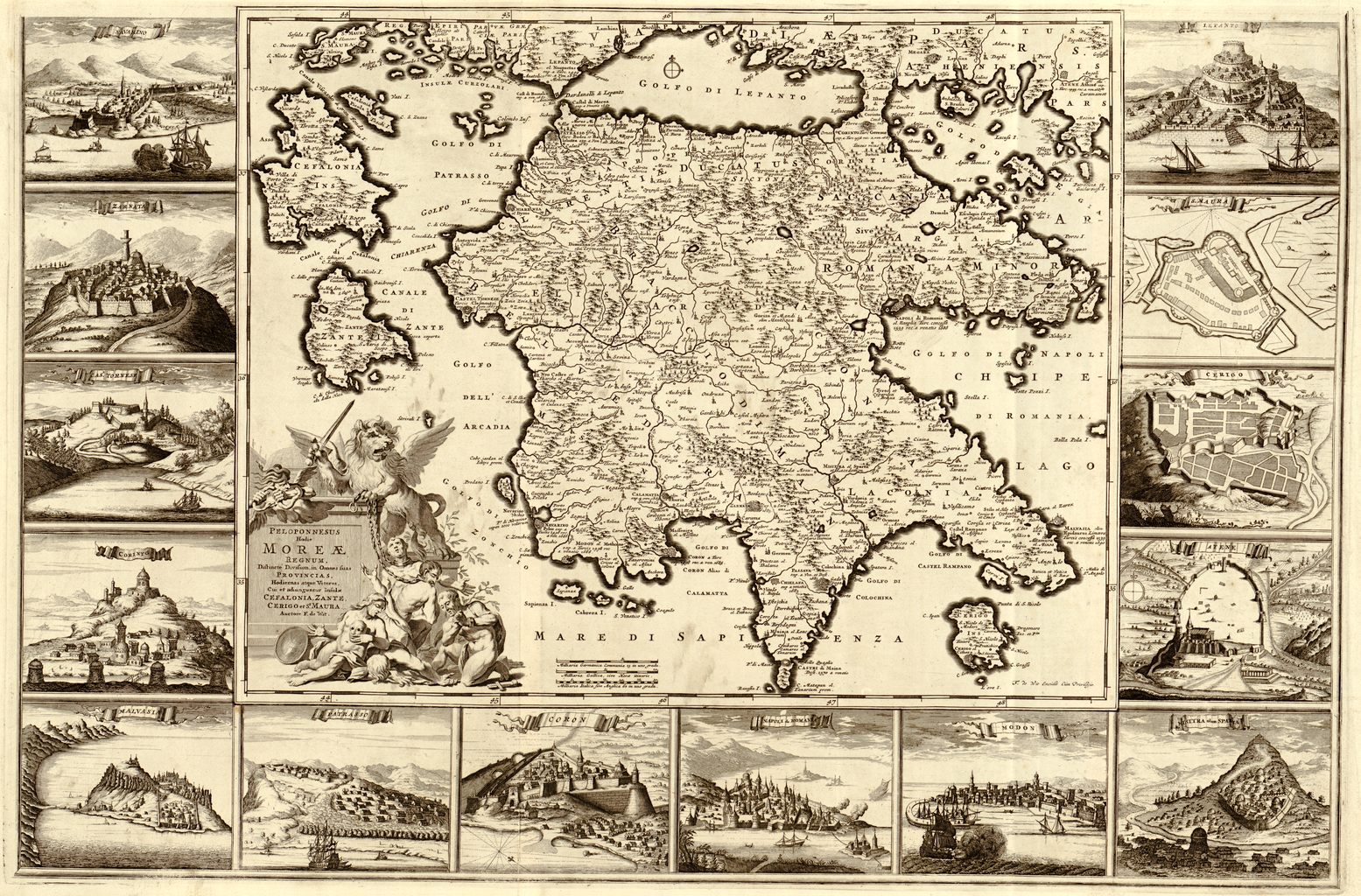
- Peloponnesus, Presently the Kingdom of the Morea, by Frederik de Wit, 1688
- Capital: Nauplia
- Government
  - Type: Colony
- Provveditore Generale di Morea
  - 1688–1690: Giacomo Corner
  - 1714–1715: Alessandro Bon
- Historical era: Early Modern
  - Venetian conquest: 1685–1687
  - Established: 1688
  - Ottoman reconquest: 1715
  - Treaty of Passarowitz: 1718
Preceded by	Succeeded by
Morea Eyalet	Morea Eyalet
- Today part of: Greece

The Kingdom of the Morea, or Realm of the Morea (Italian: Regno di Morea; Venetian: Regno de Morea; Greek: Βασίλειον του Μορέως, romanized: Vasíleion tou Moréos), was the official name the Republic of Venice gave to the Peloponnese peninsula in southern Greece (more widely known as the Morea until the 19th century) after it was conquered from the Ottoman Empire during the Morean War of 1684–99. The Venetians, with considerable success, attempted to repopulate the region and reinvigorate its agriculture and economy but failed to win the allegiance of most of the population or to secure the territory militarily. Consequently, it was retaken by the Ottomans during a brief campaign from June to September 1715.

== Background ==
Venice had a long history of interaction with the Morea, dating back to the aftermath of the Fourth Crusade (1203–1204), when the Republic acquired control of the coastal fortresses of Modon and Coron, Nauplia, and Argos. These it held even after the remainder of the peninsula was conquered by the Ottoman Turks in 1460, but they were lost in the first, second, and third Ottoman–Venetian Wars. In successive conflicts, the Ottomans pried away the other remaining Venetian overseas possessions, including Cyprus and Crete, the latter after a prolonged struggle that ended in 1669. In 1684, following the Ottoman defeat at the second Siege of Vienna, Venice joined the Holy League and declared war on the Ottoman Empire. Under the leadership of Francesco Morosini, who had led the defence of Candia, the capital of Crete, the Venetians took advantage of Ottoman weakness and rapidly seized the island of Lefkada (Santa Maura) in 1684. The next year Morosini landed on the Peloponnese and, within two years, aided by the local Greek population, took control of the peninsula and its fortresses. A subsequent Venetian campaign into eastern Continental Greece captured Athens but failed before the walls of Chalkis (Negroponte). Thereafter the conflict degenerated into a stalemate, with raids and counter-raids on both sides, until the Treaty of Karlowitz between the Ottomans and the Holy League, which in Greece left the Morea, Leucas, and the island of Aegina in Venetian hands.

The administrative division of the "Kingdom of the Morea"

== Organization of the new province ==
=== Administration ===
Already in 1688, with their control of the country practically complete, the Venetians appointed Giacomo Corner as governor-general (provveditore generale) of the Morea to administer their new territory. The task he faced was daunting, as the population had fled before the coming of war: 656 out of 2,115 villages were deserted, almost all the Muslim population had abandoned the peninsula for lands still in Ottoman hands, and even towns like Patras, which numbered 25,000 inhabitants before the war, now had only 1,615. Apart from the region of Corinthia and the autonomous Mani Peninsula, the Venetians counted only 86,468 inhabitants in 1688, out of an estimated pre-war population of 200,000. Other sources, however, such as the Englishman Bernard Randolph, who lived in Greece in 1671–1679, assessed the population of the Morea at the time as 120,000, of which one quarter were Muslim and the rest Christian. This accords with the attested demographic decline across the Ottoman Empire in the 17th century and with the demands made by the Ottoman government on the peninsula's resources during the long Cretan War.

Under Corner's oversight, a committee of three senators (Jeronimo Renier, Domenico Gritti, Marino Michiel) was sent to the Morea to reorganize the provincial administration, revive local authorities, compile a cadaster, and settle land disputes. The peninsula was divided into four provinces:

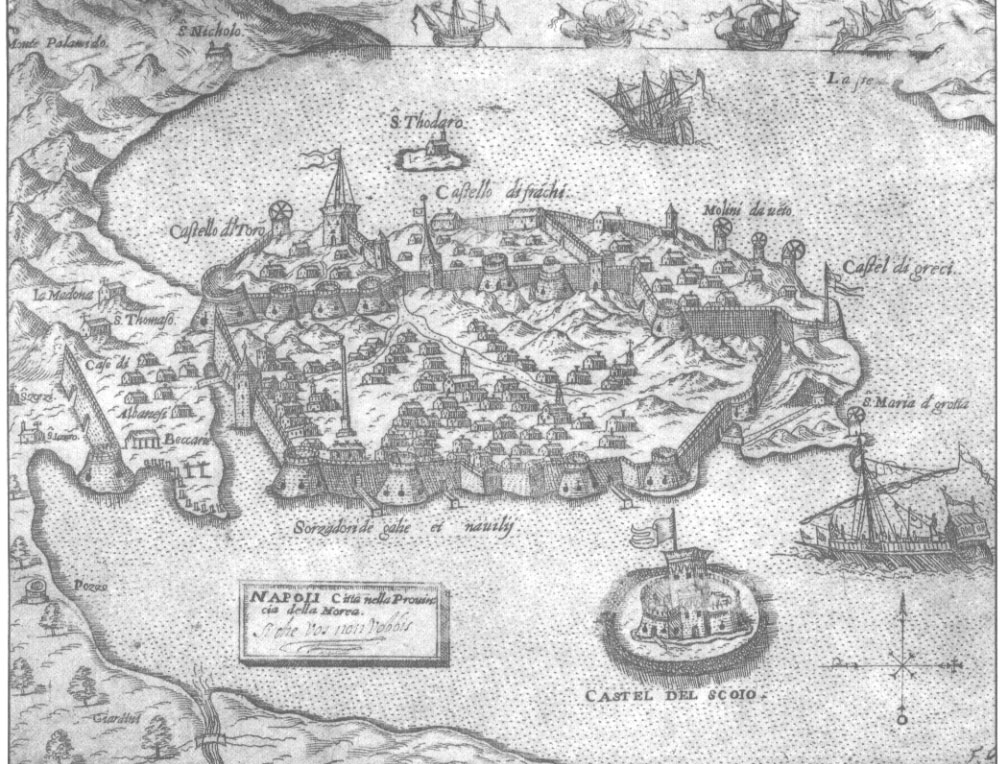
The fortified town of Nafplio in the 16th century

- Romania, in the northeastern Peloponnese, with its capital at Nauplia (Napoli di Romania), and the districts of Argos, Corinth, Tripoli, and Hagios Petros in Tsakonia
- Laconia, in the southeast, with capital at Monemvasia (Malvasia), and the districts of Mystras, Vordonia, Kelefa, Passavas and Zarnata
- Messenia, in the southwest, with its capital at Navarino, and the districts of Modon, Coron, Androusa, Kalamata, Leontari, Karytaina, Fanari, Kyparissia, and Navarino
- Achaia, in the northwest, with its capital at Patras, and the districts of Vostitsa, Kalavryta, Gastouni, and Patras

Each province and district was headed by a provveditore, who combined civil and military authority and was aided by a rector (rettore) in charge of justice and a chamberlain (camerlingo) in charge of financial affairs. The "Kingdom of the Morea" also included the administration of the islands of Kythera (Cerigo) and Antikythera (Cerigotto), off the southeastern coast of the Peloponnese, which had been in Venetian hands since 1204.

==== List of the provveditori generali of the Morea ====
The formal title of the Venetian governor-general of the Morea was Provveditore generale delle Armi ("Superintendent-general of the Arms"), with his seat in Nauplia. In the first period after the conquest he was assisted by two provveditori extraordinary. The provveditori generali appointed during the Kingdom of the Morea are known through their relazioni, the reports they submitted to the Venetian government on their deeds. These were:

1. Giacomo Corner (1688–1690)
2. Tadeo Gradenigo, provveditore estraordinario (1690–1692)
3. Antonio Molin, provveditore estraordinario (1692–1693)
4. Marin Michiel (1694–1695)
5. Agostino Sagredo (1695–1697)
6. Paolo Nani (1697)
7. Francesco Grimani (1698–1701)
8. Giacomo da Mosto (1701–1703)
9. Antonio Nani (1703–1705)
10. Angelo Emo (1705–1708)
11. Marco Loredan (1708–1711)
12. Antonio Loredan (1711–1714)
13. Alessandro Bon (1714–1715)

=== Economic and social development ===
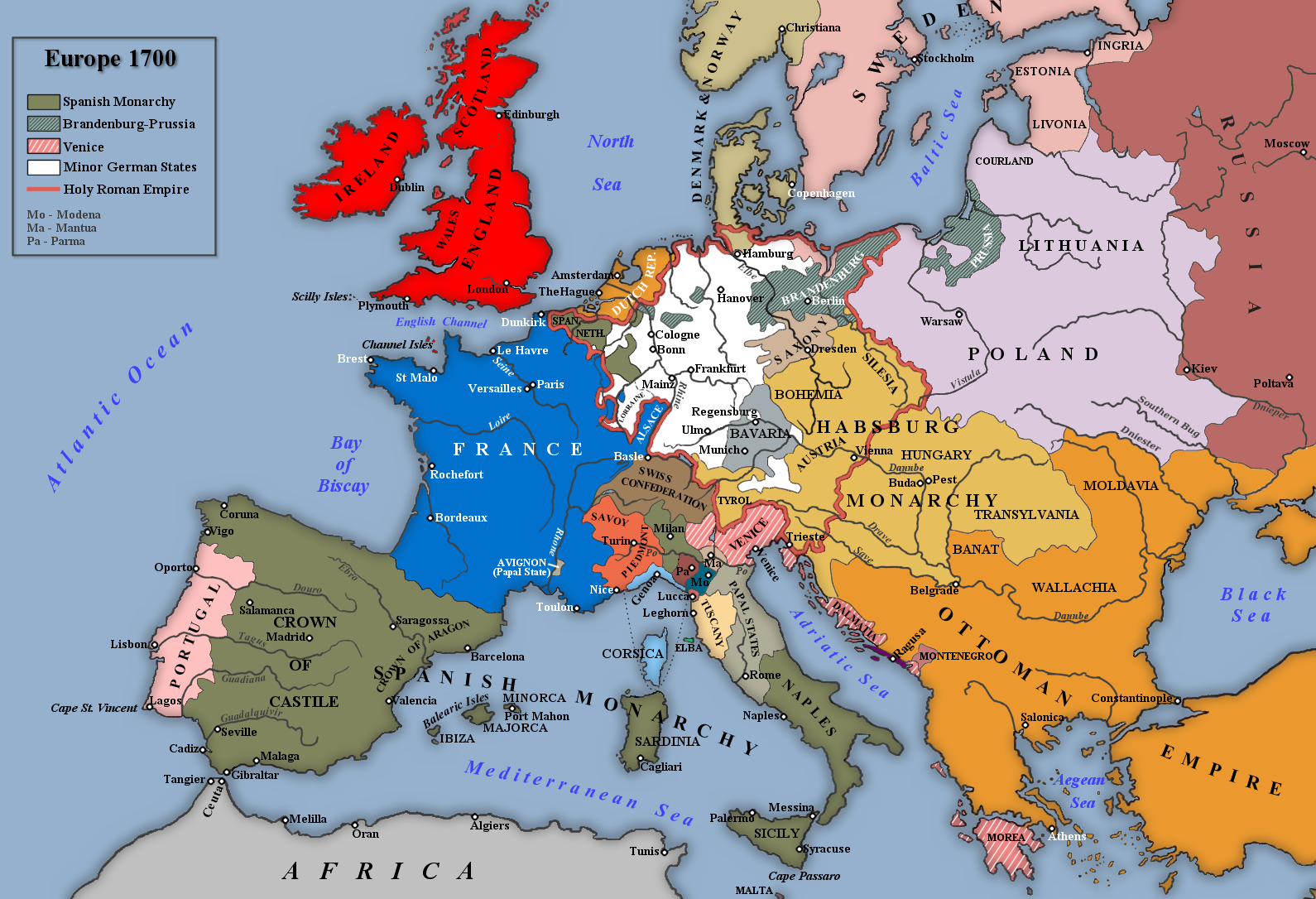
The Kingdom of the Morea, shown within Europe in 1700

To restore the province, settlers were encouraged to immigrate from other Greek lands with the lure of considerable land grants, chiefly from Attica but also from other parts of Central Greece, especially areas that had suffered during the war. 2,000 Cretans, Catholic Chians, Venetian citizens from the Ionian Islands, and even some Bulgarians answered this call. In addition, mention is made of 1,317 Muslim families who remained, converted to Christianity, and were given lands or enterprises as concessions. As a result of these policies, the population recovered rapidly: apart from Mani, the Venetian registers record 97,118 inhabitants in 1691, 116,000 a year later, and 176,844 by 1700. Due to the relative privileges granted to the urban population, the period was also marked by an influx of the agrarian population to the cities.

The Venetians engaged in a concerted effort to revive and improve the country's agriculture and commerce. Settler families were given 60 stremmata each, while the elders of the local communities were allocated 100. New grape varieties were introduced from France and Italy, and an import tax was levied on foreign wine, laying the foundations for the revival of viticulture and the raisin trade with Western Europe. Measures were taken to develop forestry, and the indigenous silk industry was promoted. Trade links were established both with the rest of Ottoman Greece and with the North African coast, which exported the Morea's main produce: raisins, cereals, cotton, olive oil, leather, silk, and wax. As a result, the annual revenue from the province rose steadily, from 61,681 reales in 1684–85 to 274,207 in 1691 and 500,501 in 1710, of which about three-fifths were spent in the Morea itself. By way of comparison, the total tax revenue due to the Ottoman government from the province before 1684 is estimated at 1,699,000 reales.

Due to the extensive influx of migrants, the Venetian period was marked by intense social mobility. Although, in general, both the original inhabitants and the new settlers remained in the social class to which they had originally belonged, the policies of the Venetian authorities—with their continual land grants to supporters, including the hereditary quasi-fiefs known as conteas ("countships")—coupled with the economic upturn, brought about the emergence, for the first time after the disbandment of the Christian sipahis of the Peloponnese in the early 1570s, of a new affluent class of merchants and landholders, many of whom were from Athens, Chios, and the Ionian Islands. According to the Greek historian Apostolos Vakalopoulos, here lies the origin of the oligarchy of the kodjabashis, who dominated the peninsula's affairs from the late 18th century until the Greek War of Independence. By contrast, for the mass of peasants, both native and immigrant, the situation progressively worsened. Whether due to debts, abuses by officials, the exactions of corvée, or the increasing scarcity of land, many peasants—especially those who had migrated from Central Greece—chose to flee to the Ottoman-held territories across the Gulf of Corinth. They were welcomed by the Ottoman authorities, while the Venetian authorities were forced to institute military patrols to stop them. This demonstrates a deepening gulf in Moreot society: when the Turks returned in 1715, the bulk of the population remained unaffected, and only the better-off, such as contea possessors, actively supported Venice; in many cases they abandoned the peninsula for Italy following the Venetian defeat.

The depredations and turmoil of the war and its aftermath also brought about a rise in banditry across the country. To combat it, the Venetian authorities raised a provincial gendarmerie, the meidani, but also armed villagers and formed local militias, echoing the armatolik system of the Ottomans. Despite their successes in this regard, the Venetians, like the Turks before and after them, were unable to completely eradicate banditry, since the Maniots and other mountain dwellers, secure in their inaccessible strongholds, continued to defy Venetian law and raid the lowlands.

=== Church affairs ===
The Venetians left the local Greek Orthodox Church largely to its own devices to avoid alienating the population but regarded it with distrust because of its dependency on the Ecumenical Patriarch in Constantinople, who was under the close supervision of the Sultan. The Venetians tried to limit the Patriarch's influence by reducing the revenue he received from the province and insisting that the Moreot bishops be elected by their dioceses rather than appointed by the Patriarch, but they largely failed to sever the ties of the local Orthodox Church—whose de facto leader at the time became the Metropolitan of Patras—with the Patriarchate.

The Venetians showed more vigour in their efforts to impose the Catholic Church in the country, converting mosques to Catholic churches, constructing new ones, and establishing monastaries from various religious orders across the peninsula. Among the most notable events was the foundation of a Mechitarist Armenian monastery in Modon in 1708, which, after 1715, was transferred to San Lazzaro degli Armeni in Venice. The centre of the Catholic Church in the Morea was the Latin Archbishopric of Corinth.

=== Security ===
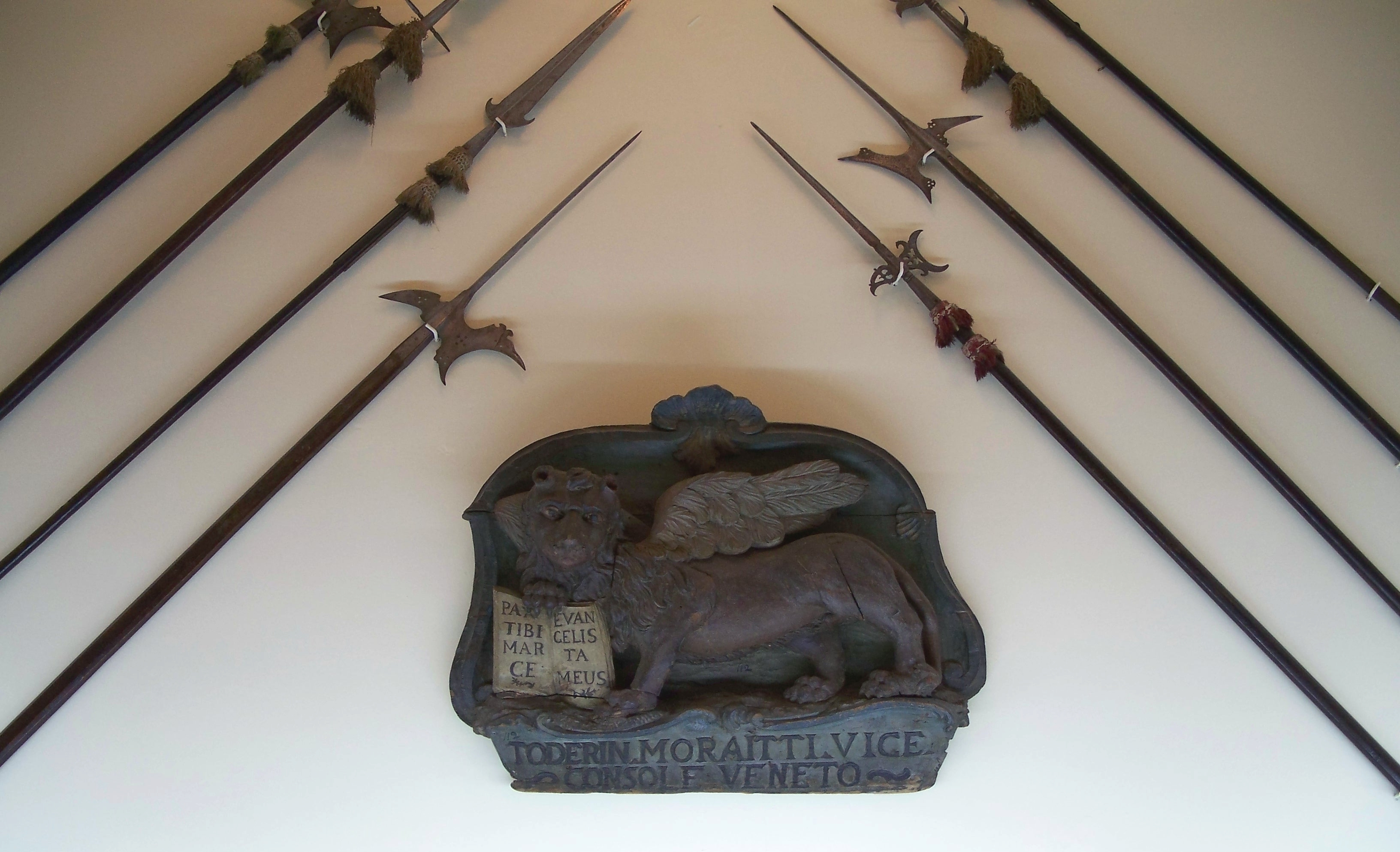
Venetian Lion of Saint Mark and halberds from the time of the "Kingdom of the Morea" in the National Historical Museum, Athens.

Despite the Treaty of Karlowitz, the Ottomans were unreconciled to the loss of the Morea, and by 1702 there were rumours of impending war, with troops and supplies sent to the Ottoman provinces adjoining the Morea. The Republic was well aware of Ottoman intentions, and from the start of its rule in the Morea its officials toured the fortresses to ascertain their state and capacity to resist. However, the Venetians' position was hampered by supply and morale problems and by an extreme lack of troops: even during the war, in 1690 the Venetian forces in southern Greece numbered only 4,683 men, both mercenaries from Western Europe and local Greeks (recruited under the Venetian cernide system); and in 1702 the garrison at Corinth, which covered the main invasion route from the mainland, numbered only 2,045 infantry and barely a thousand cavalry. At any given time 3 to 4 oltramarini regiments were stationed in the Morea. Although a detailed survey in 1698 found serious deficiencies in all the fortresses of the Morea, little seems to have been done to remedy them. Almost the only major work undertaken by the Venetians during their rule in the Morea was the new citadel for Nauplia on the height of Palamidi overlooking the city, whose construction began under Morosini's supervision during the Morean War. In the event, however, the city's defences held out for only a few days against the determined Ottoman attacks in 1715.

== Ottoman reconquest ==
Following their victory in the Russo-Turkish War of 1710–1711 and citing various Venetian transgressions against Ottoman shipping as an excuse, the Ottomans declared war on 9 December 1714. A large army, reportedly 70,000 men under the command of Grand Vizier Silahdar Damat Ali Pasha, left Constantinople for the Morea, which it entered in late June. The Venetian forces, barely 5,000 strong under the provveditore generale Alessandro Bon and the captain-general Geronimo Delphino, were scattered among various fortresses and unable to impede the Ottoman advance. The Acrocorinth citadel, the key to the peninsula, surrendered after only five days of bombardment, followed by the capitulation of Aegina and Argos. The Ottomans then proceeded to Nauplia, which was captured and ransacked after the fortress of Palamidi was stormed on 20 July. Its fall sealed the fate of the Morea, as the local inhabitants (except the Maniots) swiftly declared their allegiance to the Ottomans. The Venetians abandoned Navarino and Coron, hoping to hold out in Modon, but the rebellion of the Greek and mercenary soldiers allowed the Ottomans to take possession of the fortress with ease. With the capture of the Castle of the Morea on 16 August and the surrender of Monemvasia on 7 September and Kythera, the occupation of the "Kingdom of the Morea" was complete.

Kythera returned to Venetian rule in 1718 with the Treaty of Passarowitz, but the Morea remained under Ottoman control for another century, until the outbreak of the Greek War of Independence in 1821.

== Sources ==
- Aldrighetti, Giorgio; de Biasi, Mario (1998). Il Gonfalone di San Marco: analisi storico-araldica dello stemma, gonfalone, sigillo e bandiera della Citta di Venezia (in Italian). Venice: Filippi.
- Chasiotis, Ioannis (1975). "Η κάμψη της Οθωμανικής δυνάμεως" [The decline of Ottoman power]. In Christopoulos, Georgios A. & Bastias, Ioannis K. (eds.). Ιστορία του Ελληνικού Έθνους [History of the Greek Nation] (in Greek). Vol. ΙΑ: Ο Ελληνισμός υπό ξένη κυριαρχία (περίοδος 1669 - 1821), Τουρκοκρατία - Λατινοκρατία [Hellenism under Foreign Rule (Period 1669 - 1821), Turkocracy – Latinocracy]. Athens: Ekdotiki Athinon. pp. 8–51. ISBN 978-960-213-100-8.
- Da Mosto, Andrea (1940). L'Archivio di Stato di Venezia. Indice Generale, Storico, Descrittivo ed Analitico. Tomo II: Archivi dell'Amministrazione Provinciale della Repubblica Veneta, archivi delle rappresentanze diplomatiche e consolari, archivi dei governi succeduti alla Repubblica Veneta, archivi degli istituti religiosi e archivi minori (PDF) (in Italian). Rome: Biblioteca d'arte editrice. OCLC 889222113. Archived from the original (PDF) on 4 March 2016.
- Davies, Siriol; Davis, J.L. (2007). "Greeks, Venice, and the Ottoman Empire". In Davies, Siriol; Davis, Jack L. (eds.). Between Venice and Istanbul: Colonial Landscapes in Early Modern Greece. American School of Classical Studies at Athens. pp. 25–31. ISBN 978-0-87661-540-9.
- Malliaris, Alexis (2007). "Population Exchange and Integration of Immigrant Communities in the Venetian Morea, 1687–1715". In Davies, Siriol; Davis, Jack L. (eds.). Between Venice and Istanbul: Colonial Landscapes in Early Modern Greece. American School of Classical Studies at Athens. pp. 97–108. ISBN 978-0-87661-540-9.
- Dokos, Konstantinos; Panagopoulos, Georgios (1993). Το Βενετικό Κτηματολόγιο της Βοστίτσας [The Venetian Cadaster of Vostitsa] (in Greek). Athens: Cultural Institute of the National Bank of Greece.
- von Ranke, Leopold (1862). "Περί τῆς ἐν Πελοποννήσῳ Ἐνετοκρατίας (1685–1715)" [On the Venetian rule in the Peloponnese (1685–1715)]. Pandora (in Greek). Translated by Kalligas, Pavlos. Issue 287, pp. 553–557; Issue 288, pp. 577–583; Issue 289, pp. 1–9; Issue 290, pp. 25–34.
- Setton, Kenneth Meyer (1991). Venice, Austria, and the Turks in the Seventeenth Century. Philadelphia, Mass.: The American Philosophical Society. ISBN 0-87169-192-2. ISSN 0065-9738.
- Topping, Peter (1976). "Premodern Peloponnesus: The Land and the People Under Venetian Rule (1685–1715)". Annals of the New York Academy of Sciences. 268 (1): 92–108. Bibcode:1976NYASA.268...92T. doi:10.1111/j.1749-6632.1976.tb47637.x. S2CID 83944891.
- Topping, Peter W. (2000). "The Southern Argolid from Byzantine to Ottoman Times". In Sutton, Susan Buck (ed.). Contingent Countryside: Settlement, Economy, and Land Use in the Southern Argolid Since 1700. Stanford University Press. pp. 25–40. ISBN 978-0-804733151.
- Vakalopoulos, Apostolos E. (1973). Ιστορία του νέου ελληνισμού, Τόμος Δ': Τουρκοκρατία 1669–1812 – Η οικονομική άνοδος και ο φωτισμός του γένους (Έκδοση Β') [History of modern Hellenism, Volume IV: Turkish rule 1669–1812 – Economic upturn and enlightenment of the nation (2nd Edition)] (in Greek). Thessaloniki: Emm. Sfakianakis & Sons.
- Vakalopoulos, Apostolos E. (1975). "Πελοπόννησος: Η τελευταία περίοδος βενετικής κυριαρχίας (1685–1715)" [Peloponnese: The last period of Venetian rule (1685–1715)]. In Christopoulos, Georgios A. & Bastias, Ioannis K. (eds.). Ιστορία του Ελληνικού Έθνους [History of the Greek Nation] (in Greek). Vol. ΙΑ: Ο Ελληνισμός υπό ξένη κυριαρχία (περίοδος 1669 - 1821), Τουρκοκρατία - Λατινοκρατία [Hellenism under Foreign Rule (Period 1669 - 1821), Turkocracy – Latinocracy]. Athens: Ekdotiki Athinon. pp. 206–209. ISBN 978-960-213-100-8.
