= Antonio Giancix =

Dalmatian military official (1666 - 1739)

Antonio Giancix (1666 – d. after 1739) was a Dalmatian (Croatian) professional oltramarini officer, engineer and military architect in Venetian service.

Giancix, whose name historically is rendered in a number of versions, including Giansich, Giaxich, and Jancix, served his entire career in the Venetian army, rising through the ranks.

He participated in numerous battles and was wounded several times.

As commander of the defence of Modon in 1715 during the Ottoman reconquest of the Morea, he was captured by the Ottomans and detained for five years.

He continued his career, eventually becoming the third figure in the Venetian army to hold the rank of tenente generale.

He is primarily associated with his main work, the Palamidi fortress in Nafplio, Greece, the only fortress that he designed from scratch.

He modernised many other fortresses. He was particularly active before the Ottoman–Venetian War (1714–1718), when he designed improvements for the most critical defensive infrastructure (Knin, Corfu, Rio Castle, Nafplio, Modon).
