= Pavlos Kalligas =

Greek jurist, writer and politician (1814–1896)

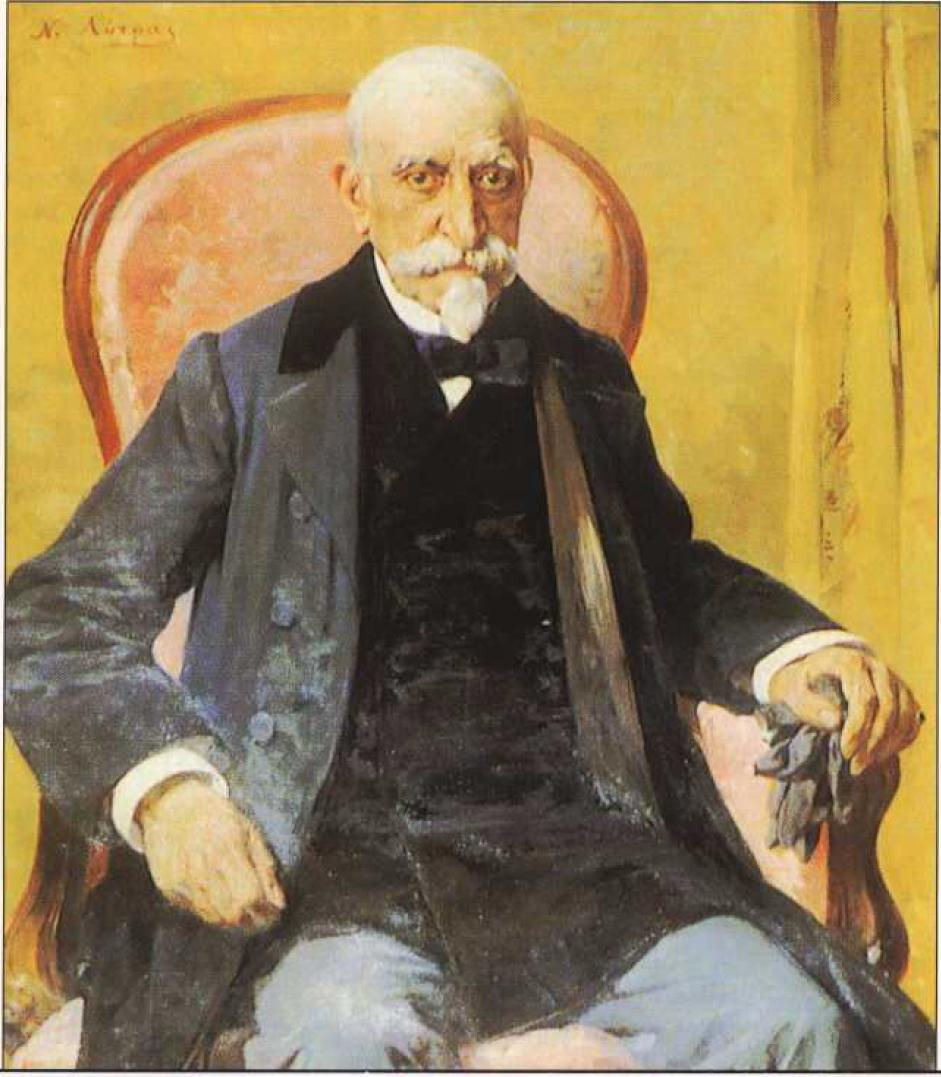
Pavlos Kalligas (portrait by Nikiforos Lytras)

Pavlos Kalligas (Greek: Παύλος Καλλιγάς; 1814–1896) was a Greek jurist, writer and politician. He served as a professor at the University of Athens; as Member and Speaker of the Hellenic Parliament; as cabinet minister for Foreign Affairs, Education, Finance and Justice; and chairman of the National Bank of Greece.

== Biography ==
Kalligas was born in Smyrna in the Ottoman Empire in 1814, to Panagis Anninos-Kalligas, a wealthy merchant from Cephalonia, and Sofia Mavrokordatou from Chios. With the outbreak of the Greek Revolution in 1821, his father took the family to Trieste to avoid anti-Greek massacres. Pavlos Kalligas was sent to the Flanginian School in Venice and completed high school in the Heyer College in Geneva, before returning to Trieste to help in his father's commercial business. After the elder Kalligas' death in 1832, however, Pavlos abandoned commerce and turned to law, studying in the universities of Munich, Berlin and Heidelberg. In the latter he achieved his doctorate in Law under Eduard Gans and Friedrich Carl von Savigny.

After completing his studies, in 1837 Kalligas came with his mother to the independent Kingdom of Greece, first to Nafplion and then to Athens, where he was appointed lecturer of Natural Law at the newly founded University of Athens. In 1839 he was named lecturer of International Law and in 1843, he was named professor of Roman Law. In this capacity he became a member of the first Greek Parliament, representing the university professors as provided for by the Greek Constitution of 1844. His tenure at the university was cut short in June 1845, when he clashed with Prime Minister Ioannis Kolettis, and was dismissed from his post.

Kalligas then worked for a time as a lawyer, while writing and publishing his five-volume Σύστημα του Ρωμαϊκού Δικαίου, καθ’ α εν Ελλάδι πολιτεύεται ("System of the Roman Law, as it is practised in Greece"). In 1851 he was appointed as Deputy Prosecutor in the Court of Cassation, and continued serving as a judge until 1859. In this time he served for two months in 1854 as Justice Minister in the cabinet of Alexandros Mavrokordatos. In 1860 he became legal counsel to the National Bank of Greece. In the next year, he was re-instated in the university as an extraordinary professor, before being appointed regular professor of Roman Law in 1862. Following the ousting of King Otto, Kalligas was elected a representative for Attica in the II National Assembly of 1862–64. In this period he served in the committee preparing the new Greek Constitution of 1864, and briefly as Foreign Minister in the cabinets of Dimitrios Voulgaris, Benizelos Roufos and Zinovios Valvis. In 1865 he became Minister of Justice as well as Education and Religious Affairs in the Alexandros Koumoundouros cabinet. In 1869–70, Kalligas served as rector of the University of Athens, as well as dean of the Law School in 1845, 1872 and 1877, and member of the University Senate in 1866 and 1871.

In 1879 Kalligas retired from the university, and joined the New Party of Charilaos Trikoupis, being elected to Parliament for Attica in the elections of the same year. Re-elected in 1881, he was named chairman of the Panhellenic Steam Company, and in 1882 he became Finance Minister in Trikoupis' cabinet, a post which he held until his resignation in May 1883, in protest at Trikoupis' authoritarian demeanour towards his ministers. Kalligas was then elected to two consecutive terms as Speaker of the Hellenic Parliament, serving from 4 November 1883 until 11 February 1885. In the 1885 elections he failed to enter Parliament and abandoned his political career, becoming Deputy Chairman and then Chairman of the National Bank, a post he held until his death on 16 September 1896.

== Works ==
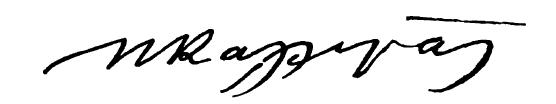
Signature of Kalligas

His published work is voluminous: aside from legal treatises, he was an ardent writer of numerous essays and studies on history—among others on the English Civil War, Byzantine court ceremonial, the Nika riots and the Council of Florence—and philosophy—from the ancient Greek philosophers to his contemporaries Theophilos Kairis and Petros Brailas Armenis, Leopold von Ranke's Die Venezianer in Morea: 1685-1715 on the Venetian rule in the Peloponnese, helped found the Pandora literary journal, and wrote a novel, Thanos Vlekas (Θάνος Βλέκας). The latter is of particular importance for modern Greek literature, as it is the first naturalist work in Greek, trying to depict the dismal realities of the emergent independent Greek state, contrary to the prevailing romantic treatment of his contemporaries.

His legal work, aside from his five-volume System of the Roman Law, was particularly notable for his first draft of a civil code for the modern Greek state in 1849 (along with Georgios Rallis), although it would take until 1945 for it to be implemented.

== Political views ==
Kalligas was a self-declared "child of the 19th century", and hence proclaimed his belief in popular sovereignty. At the same time, he was a critic of the limitations of the parliamentary system of his time, particularly of the corruption and clientelism of the parties, and warned of the dangers of the "tyranny of the majority".

As Finance Minister, he proposed an austere economic policy, limiting foreign lending and advocating increased taxation, among other measures imposing a tax on alcoholic drinks. His policy was opposed by the middle class and the merchant and industrial interests, which contributed to his resignation in May 1893.
