= Ottoman–Venetian War (1714–1718) =

Part of the Ottoman–Venetian wars

Seventh Ottoman–Venetian War
- Part of the Ottoman–Venetian wars, Ottoman–Habsburg wars, Spanish–Ottoman wars and the Ottoman–Portuguese confrontations
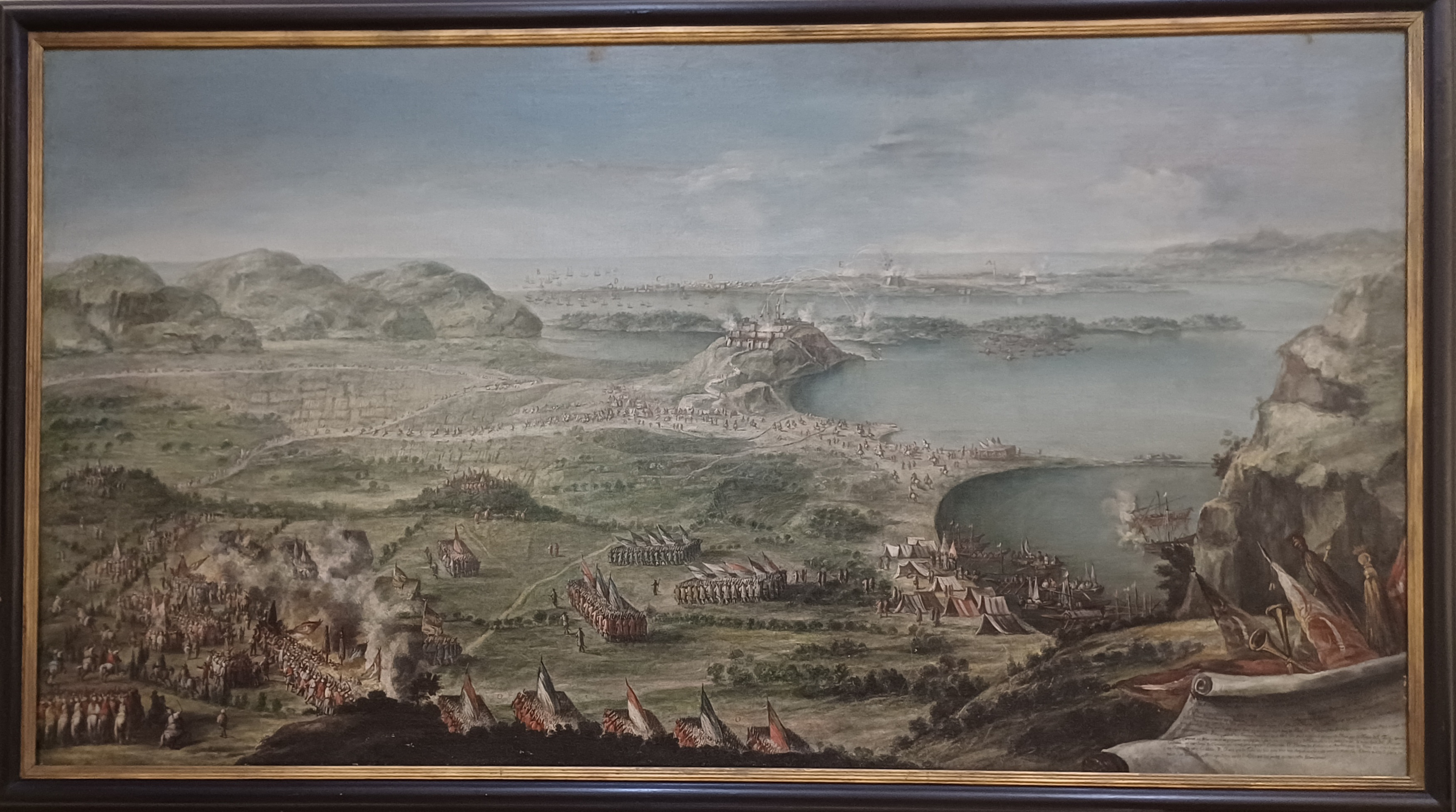
- Capture of Vonitsa and Preveza by the Venetians in November 1717
Date	9 December 1714 – 21 July 1718
Location	Peloponnese, Aegean Sea, Ionian Islands, Dalmatia
Result	Treaty of Passarowitz
Territorial changes	Morea ceded back to the Ottoman Empire; some Venetian gains in Dalmatia.

Belligerents
Republic of Venice; Habsburg Monarchy (Note: from 1716); Kingdom of Portugal (Note: 1716–1717); Order of Malta; Papal States; Spain; Himariotes; Hajduks	Ottoman Empire; Supported by: Regency of Algiers; Ottoman Tripolitania; Beylik of Tunis

Commanders and leaders
Daniele Dolfin; Johann Matthias von der Schulenburg; Andrea Pisani; Eugene of Savoy	Silahdar Damat Ali Pasha; Canım Hoca Mehmed Pasha; Kara Mustafa Pasha

Casualties and losses
40,000 killed and wounded (Note: Casualties of the Holy Roman Empire); 20,000 killed and wounded (Note: Casualties of the Italias)	80,000 killed and wounded

The Seventh Ottoman–Venetian War (also called the Second Morean War, the Small War or, in Croatia, the War of Sinj) was fought between the Republic of Venice and the Ottoman Empire between 1714 and 1718. It was the last conflict between the two powers, and ended with an Ottoman victory and the loss of Venice's major possession in the Greek peninsula, the Peloponnese (Morea). Where the Barbary States intervention to support the Ottomans. Venice was saved from a greater defeat by the intervention of Austria in 1716 and by some naval success. The war ended with Treaty of Passarowitz in 1718.

== Background ==
Following the Ottoman Empire's defeat in the second siege of Vienna in 1683, the Holy League of Linz gathered most European states (except for France, England and the Netherlands) in a common front against the Ottomans. In the resulting Great Turkish War (1683–1699) the Ottoman Empire suffered a number of defeats such as the battles of Mohács and Zenta, and in the Treaty of Karlowitz (1699), was forced to cede the bulk of Hungary to the Habsburg monarchy, Podolia to Poland-Lithuania, while Azov was taken by the Russian Empire.

Further south, the Republic of Venice had launched its own attack on the Ottoman Empire, seeking revenge for successive conquests of its overseas empire by the Turks, most recently (1669) the loss of Crete. Venetian troops, under the command of the able general Francesco Morosini (who became Doge of Venice in 1688), were able early in the conflict to seize the island of Lefkada (Santa Maura) in 1684, the Peloponnese (Morea) peninsula (1685–1687) and parts of Continental Greece, although attempts to conquer Chalkis (Negroponte), recover Crete and hold on to Chios failed. In the Treaty of Karlowitz, Venice gained recognition of its control over Cephalonia and the Morea, and restored the situation in the Aegean to its pre-war status quo, leaving only the island of Tinos in Venetian hands.

The Ottomans were from the outset determined to reverse these losses, especially the Morea, whose loss had been keenly felt in the Ottoman court: a large part of the income of the Valide sultan (the Ottoman queen-mothers) had come from there. Already in 1702, there were tensions between the two powers and rumours of war because of the Venetian confiscation of an Ottoman merchant vessel; troops and supplies were moved to the Ottoman provinces adjoining the Venetian "Kingdom of the Morea". The Venetian position there was weak, with only a few thousand troops in the whole peninsula, plagued by supply, disciplinary and morale problems. Nevertheless, peace was maintained between the two powers for twelve more years. In the meantime, the Ottomans began a reform of their navy, while Venice found itself increasingly isolated diplomatically from the other European powers: the Holy League had fractured after its victory, and the War of the Spanish Succession (1701–1714) and the Great Northern War (1700–1721) preoccupied the attention of most European states. The Ottomans took advantage of the favourable international situation to settle their scores with Russia, inflicting on them a heavy defeat in the Russo-Turkish War (1710–1713). This victory encouraged the Ottoman leadership and after the Russo-Turkish Treaty of Adrianople in June 1713, the way was open for an attack on Venice.

A pretext was easy to find: the seizure of an Ottoman ship carrying the treasures of the former Grand Vizier, Damad Hasan Pasha, as well as the Venetians' granting of sanctuary to Danilo I, the Prince-Bishop of Montenegro, after he had launched an abortive revolt against the Turks. As a result, on 9 December 1714, the Ottoman Empire declared war on Venice.

== Ottoman reconquest of the Morea ==
During the early months of 1715, they assembled an army of c. 70,000 men in Macedonia under the Grand Vizier Silahdar Damat Ali Pasha. On 22 May, Grand Vizier marched south from Thessalonica, arriving at Thebes on 9 June, where he held a review of the troops. Although the accuracy of his figures is open to doubt, the journal of the French interpreter Benjamin Brue, reports 14,994 cavalry and 59,200 infantry as present at Thebes on 9 June, with the total number of men involved in the campaign against the Morea placed at 110,364 (22,844 cavalry and 87,520 infantry).

After a war council on 13 June, 15,000 Janissaries under Kara Mustafa Pasha were sent to capture Lepanto, while the main body of the army under Yusuf Pasha and the Agha of the Janissaries moved onto the Isthmus of Corinth and the two fortresses of Acrocorinth and Nauplia, the main Venetian strongholds in the Morea. In the meantime, the Ottoman Fleet, numbering 80 warships under Canum Hoca, had captured the last Venetian possessions in the Aegean, the islands of Tinos and Aigina.

The Venetians, who did not have any standing army and relied mainly on mercenaries, could only muster 8,000 men and 42 mostly small ships, under the command of the Captain-General Daniel Delfin. This force was not only insufficient to meet the Ottoman army in the field, but also inadequate to man the many fortifications that the Venetians had built or enhanced during the past decades. In addition, the local Greek population disliked Venetian rule, something Damad Ali exploited, by ensuring that his troops respected their safety and property. Thus he was able to count on the good will of the Greeks, who provided his troops with ample provisions, while the Venetians, who hoped to recruit a militia amongst the native population, were left isolated in their forts.

On 25 June, the Ottoman army crossed the Isthmus of Corinth and entered the Morea. The citadel of Acrocorinth, which controlled the passage to the peninsula, surrendered after a brief siege, on terms of safe passage for the garrison and the civilians. However, some Janissaries, eager for plunder, disobeyed Damat Ali's orders and entered the citadel. A large part of the garrison, including the provveditore Giacomo Minoto, and most of the civilians were massacred or sold to slavery. Only 180 Venetians were saved and transported to Corfu. These tragic events later inspired Lord Byron's poem The Siege of Corinth.

After Corinth, the Ottomans advanced against Nauplia (Napoli di Romagna), the main base of Venetian power in the Morea. Nafplion was well-protected by several strong forts and had a garrison of 2,000 men. However, on 20 July, after only nine days of siege, the Ottomans exploded a mine under the bastions of Palamidi and successfully stormed the fort. The Venetian defenders panicked and retreated, leading to a general collapse of the defence.

The Ottomans then advanced to the southwest, where the forts of Navarino and Koroni were abandoned by the Venetians, who gathered their remaining forces at Methoni (Modon). However, being denied effective support from the sea by Delfin's reluctance to endanger his fleet by engaging the Ottoman navy, the fort capitulated. The remaining Venetian strongholds, including the last remaining outposts on Crete (Spinalonga and Souda), likewise capitulated in exchange for safe departure. Within a hundred days, the entire Peloponnese had been re-taken by the Ottomans.

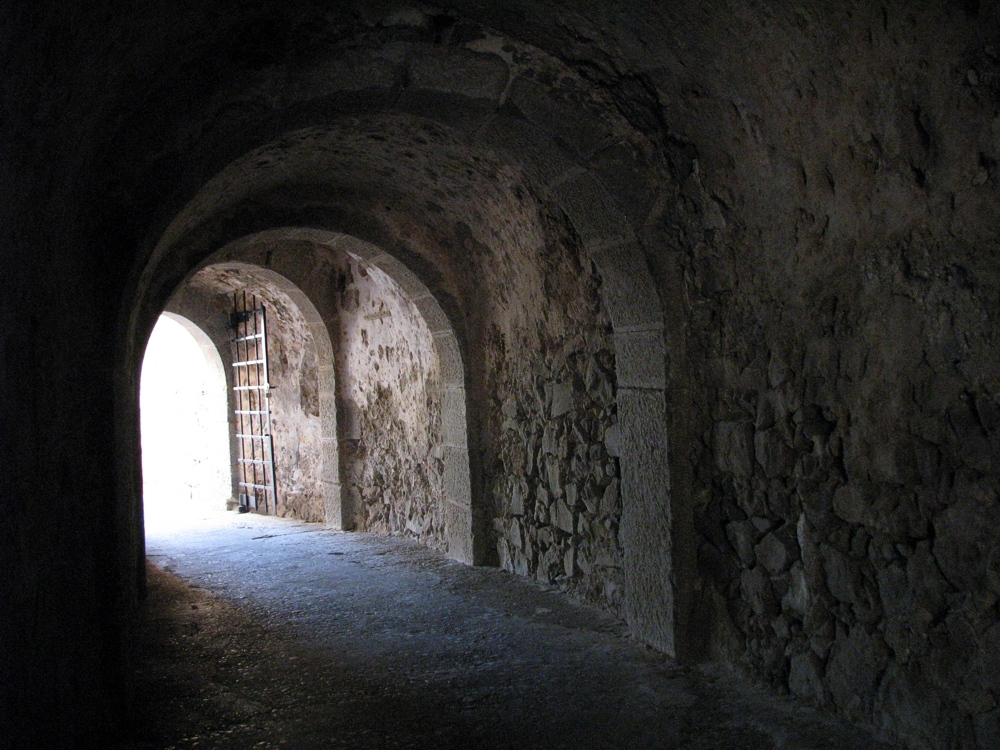
Dante’s Gate in Spinalonga fort, the last remaining Venetian outpost on Crete

According to the Ottomanist Virginia Aksan, the campaign had been "basically a walkover for the Ottomans". Despite the presence of sufficient materiel, the Venetian garrisons were weak, and the Venetian government unable to finance the war, while the Ottomans not only enjoyed a considerable numerical superiority, but also were more willing "to tolerate large losses and considerable desertion": according to Brue, no less than 8,000 Ottoman soldiers were killed and another 6,000 wounded in the just nine days of the siege of Nauplia. Furthermore, unlike the Venetians, the Ottomans this time enjoyed the effective support of their fleet, which among other activities ferried a number of large siege cannons to support the siege of Nauplia.

On 13 September, the Grand Vizier began his return journey, and on the 22nd, near Nauplia, received the congratulations of the Sultan. A week of parades and celebrations followed. On 10 October, the Standard of the Prophet was ceremonially placed in its casket, a sign that the campaign was over. The troops received six months' worth of pay on 17 October near Larissa, and the Grand Vizier returned to the capital, for a triumphal entrance, on 2 December.

== The siege of Corfu ==
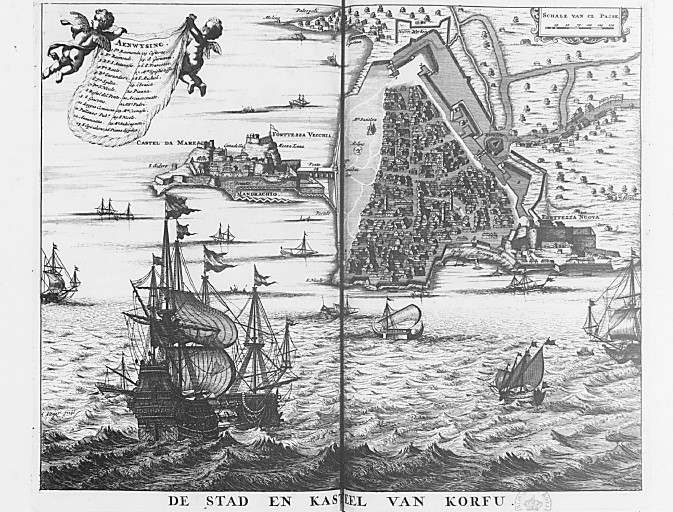
City plan of Corfu in 1688, depicting its fortifications

After their success in the Morea, the Ottomans moved against the Venetian-held Ionian Islands. They occupied the island of Lefkada (Santa Maura), which the Venetians had taken in 1684, and the fort of Butrinto opposite the city of Corfu. On 8 July 1716, an Ottoman army of 33,000 men landed on Corfu, the most important of the Ionian Islands. Despite an indecisive naval battle on the same day, the Ottoman land army continued its disembarkment and advanced towards the city of Corfu. On 19 July, after capturing the outlying forts of Mantouki, Garitsa, Avrami and of the Saviour, the siege began.

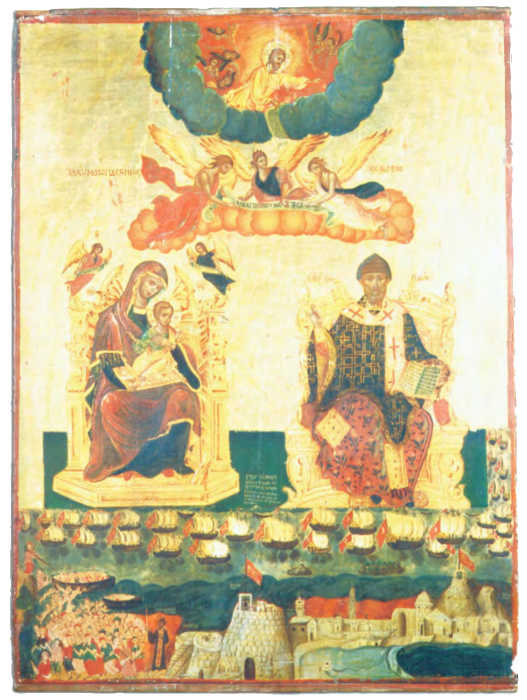
The miracle of Corfu; Byzantine icon in Santa Maria Assunta Church of Villa Badessa, Italy

The defence was led by Count Johann Matthias von der Schulenburg, who had roughly 8,000 men at his command. The extensive fortifications and the determination of the defenders withstood several assaults. After a great storm on 9 August—which the defenders attributed to the intervention of Corfu's patron saint, Saint Spyridon—caused significant casualties among the besiegers, the siege was broken off on 11 August and the last Ottoman forces withdrew on 20 August.

== Austrian intervention and conclusion of the war ==
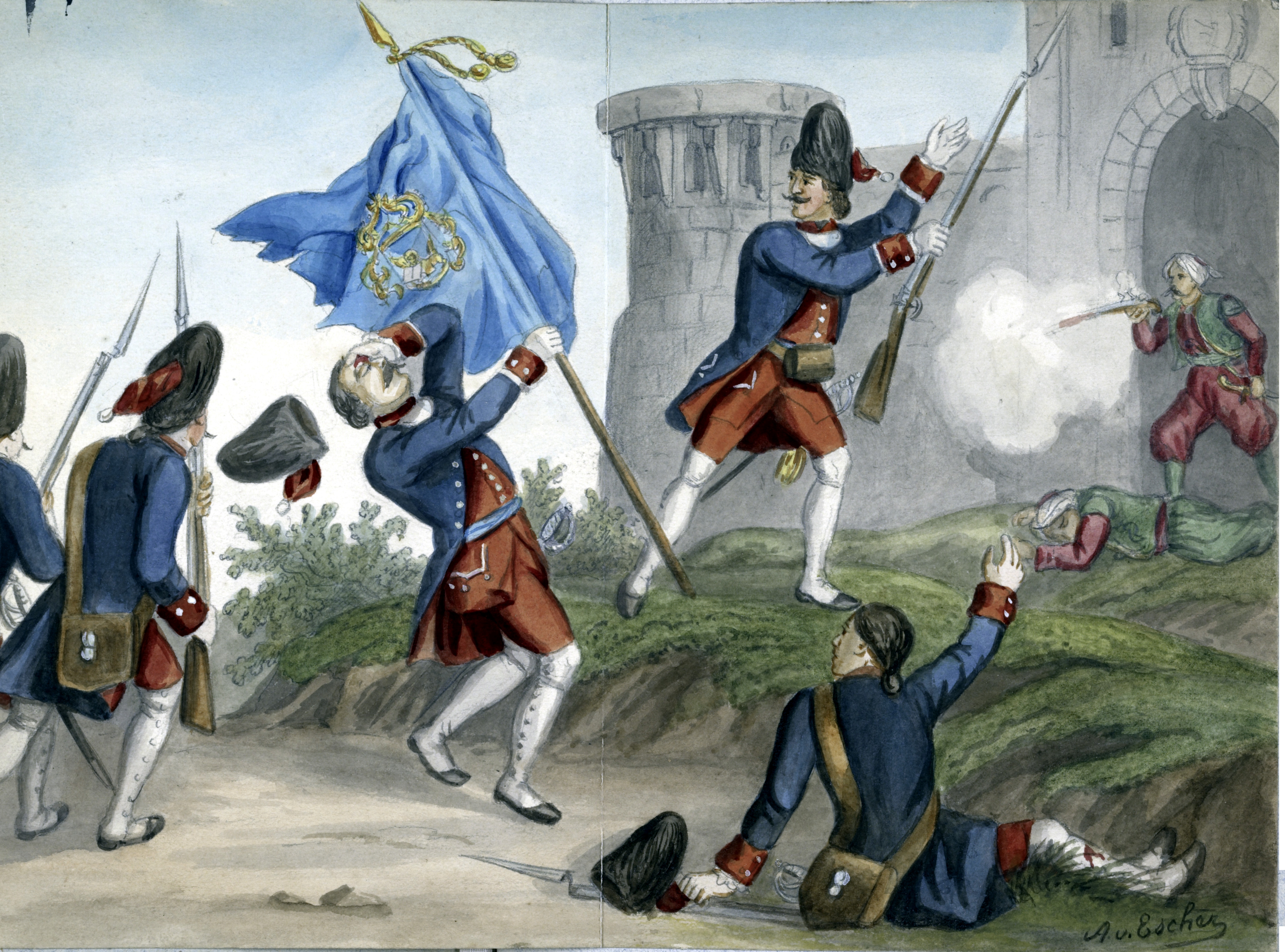
Venetian grenadiers of the Müller Regiment attacking an Ottoman fort in Dalmatia, 1717

In the summer of 1715, the pasha of Bosnia marched against the Venetian possessions in Dalmatia, with an army that reputedly numbered 40,000 men. The Ottomans were defeated in a siege of Sinj, but the Ottoman threat to Dalmatia played a role in Austria's decision to intervene.

With Pope Clement XI providing financial support and France guaranteeing Austrian possessions in Italy, Austria felt ready to intervene. On 13 April 1716, Emperor Charles VI renewed his alliance with Venice, whereupon the Ottomans declared war on Austria. The Austrian threat forced the Ottomans to direct their forces away from the remaining Venetian possessions, but the Serenissima was too weak to mount any large-scale counter-offensive. Only its navy resumed a more aggressive stance, with naval actions between the Venetian and Ottoman fleets taking place in the Aegean Sea, such as the Battle of Imbros and the Battle of Matapan a month later, but these were generally indecisive and did not affect the outcome of the war. The only permanent Venetian success was the capture of the fortresses of Preveza and Arta in 1717. With the Austrian victories at the Battle of Petrovaradin and the Siege of Belgrade, however, the Ottomans were forced to sign the Treaty of Passarowitz. Although the Ottomans lost significant territories to Austria, they maintained their conquests against Venice in the Peloponnese and Crete, with the exception of Preveza (fell in 1717 to Venetians) and a few forts in Herzegovina (Imotski was taken in 1717).

== Aftermath ==
Following the end of the war, the Republic of Venice was reduced to a de facto Habsburg vassal, rather than an independent actor in international politics, until its abolition in 1797.

== Sources ==
- Aksan, Virginia H. (2013). Ottoman Wars 1700–1870: An Empire Besieged. London and New York: Routledge. ISBN 978-0-582-30807-7.
- Anderson, R. C. (1952). Naval Wars in the Levant 1559–1853. Princeton: Princeton University Press.
- Chasiotis, Ioannis (1975). "Η κάμψη της Οθωμανικής δυνάμεως" [The decline of Ottoman power]. In Christopoulos, Georgios A. & Bastias, Ioannis K. (eds.). Ιστορία του Ελληνικού Έθνους [History of the Greek Nation] (in Greek). Vol. ΙΑ: Ο Ελληνισμός υπό ξένη κυριαρχία (περίοδος 1669 - 1821), Τουρκοκρατία - Λατινοκρατία [Hellenism under Foreign Rule (Period 1669 - 1821), Turkocracy – Latinocracy]. Athens: Ekdotiki Athinon. pp. 8–51. ISBN 978-960-213-100-8.
- Finlay, George (1856). The History of Greece under Othoman and Venetian Domination. London: William Blackwood and Sons. OCLC 1903753.
- Ingrao, Charles; Samardžić, Nikola; Pešalj, Jovan, eds. (2011). The Peace of Passarowitz, 1718. West Lafayette: Purdue University Press. ISBN 978-1557535948.
- Lane, Frederic Chapin (1973). Venice, a Maritime Republic. Baltimore, Maryland: Johns Hopkins University Press. ISBN 978-0-8018-1460-0.
- Nani Mocenigo, Mario (1935). Storia della marina veneziana: da Lepanto alla caduta della Repubblica [History of the Venetian navy: from Lepanto to the fall of the Republic] (in Italian). Rome: Tipo lit. Ministero della Marina – Uff. Gabinetto.
- Prelli, Alberto; Mugnai, Bruno (2016). L'ultima vittoria della Serenissima: 1716 – L'assedio di Corfù (in Italian). Bassano del Grappa: itinera progetti. ISBN 978-88-88542-74-4.
- Setton, Kenneth Meyer (1991). Venice, Austria, and the Turks in the Seventeenth Century. Philadelphia, Massachusetts: The American Philosophical Society. ISBN 0-87169-192-2.
- Shaw, Stanford Jay; Shaw, Ezel Kural (1976). History of the Ottoman Empire and Modern Turkey. Cambridge University Press. pp. 231–234. ISBN 978-0-521-29163-7.
- Vakalopoulos, Apostolos E. (1973). Ιστορία του νέου ελληνισμού, Τόμος Δ′: Τουρκοκρατία 1669–1812 – Η οικονομική άνοδος και ο φωτισμός του γένους (Έκδοση Β′) [History of modern Hellenism, Volume IV: Turkish rule 1669–1812 – Economic upturn and enlightenment of the nation] (in Greek) (2nd ed.). Thessaloniki: Emm. Sfakianakis & Sons.
