= Siege of Nauplia (1715) =

Part of the Ottoman–Venetian War of 1714–18

- Part of the Seventh Ottoman–Venetian War
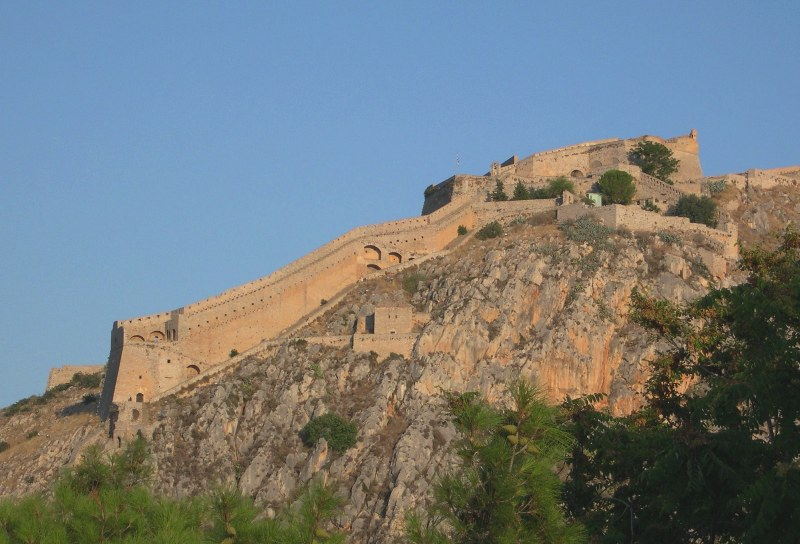
- View of the Palamidi fortress today
Date	12–20 July 1715
Location	Nauplia
Result	Ottoman victory

Belligerents
Republic of Venice	Ottoman Empire

Commanders and leaders
(Republic of Venice) Geronimo Dolfin (Republic of Venice) Alessandro Bon	Silahdar Damat Ali Pasha

Strength
Over 4,500 men	Over 70,000 men

Casualties and losses
All killed or enslaved	Over 8,000 killed

The siege of Nauplia took place on 12–20 July 1715, when the Ottoman Empire captured the city of Nauplia (Napoli di Romagna), the capital of the Republic of Venice's "Kingdom of the Morea" in southern Greece. Although Nauplia was strongly fortified and had been further strengthened with the construction of Palamidi fortress by the Venetians, the Ottomans managed to overcome them. The Ottomans exploded a mine and took Palamidi by storm on 20 July. The Venetian defenders retreated in panic, leading to the rapid fall of Acronauplia and the rest of the city. The garrison and populace were massacred or carried off as prisoners. The fall of Nauplia signalled the effective end of Venetian resistance to the Ottoman reconquest of the Morea, which was completed by 7 September.

== Sources ==
- Chasiotis, Ioannis (1975). "Η κάμψη της Οθωμανικής δυνάμεως" [The decline of Ottoman power]. In Christopoulos, Georgios A. & Bastias, Ioannis K. (eds.). Ιστορία του Ελληνικού Έθνους [History of the Greek Nation] (in Greek). Vol. ΙΑ: Ο Ελληνισμός υπό ξένη κυριαρχία (περίοδος 1669 - 1821), Τουρκοκρατία - Λατινοκρατία [Hellenism under Foreign Rule (Period 1669 - 1821), Turkocracy – Latinocracy]. Athens: Ekdotiki Athinon. pp. 8–51. ISBN 978-960-213-100-8.
- Finlay, George (1856). The History of Greece under Othoman and Venetian Domination. London: William Blackwood and Sons. OCLC 1903753.
- Setton, Kenneth Meyer (1991). Venice, Austria, and the Turks in the Seventeenth Century. Philadelphia, Massachusetts: The American Philosophical Society. ISBN 0-87169-192-2.
