= Palamidi =

Historic Venetian fortress on a headland of the Argolic Gulf at Nafplio

- Παλαμήδι Νικόλαος Σκαρης
- Nafplion, Peloponnese, Greece
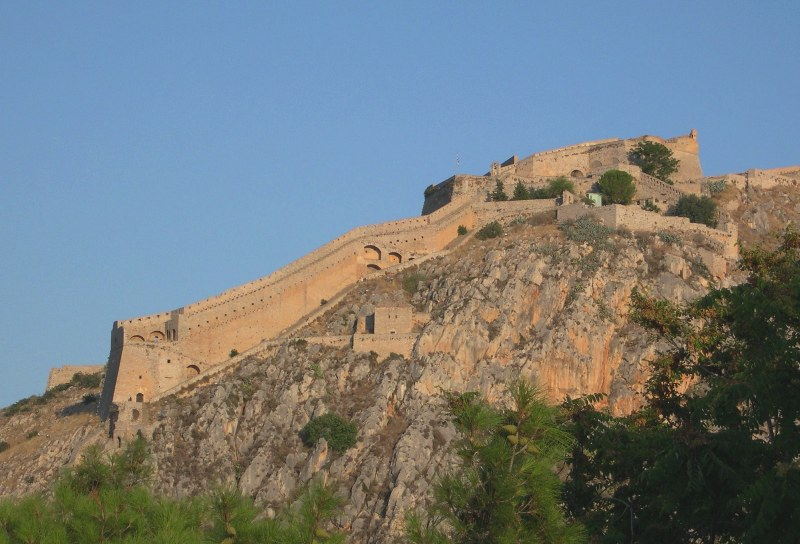
- The fortress of Palamidi.

Site information
- Type: citadel Fortress
- Owner: Greece Greek Ministry of Culture
- Controlled by: Republic of Venice 1711–1715; Ottoman Empire 1715–1822; Greece c. 1822
- Open to the public: Yes
- Condition: Ruin

Location
- Coordinates: 37.563889°N 22.795278°E

Site history
- Built: 1714
- Built by: Pierre de la Salle
- Materials: hewn stone (ashlar)

Garrison information
- Garrison: 80 (1715)

Palamidi (Greek: Παλαμήδι) is a fortress to the east of the Acronauplia in the town of Nafplio in the Peloponnese region of southern Greece. Nestled on the crest of a 216-metre-high (709 ft) hill, the fortress was built by the Venetians during their second occupation of the area (1686–1715).

The fortress was a very large and ambitious project, but was finished within a relatively short period from 1711 to 1714. It is a typical baroque fortress based on the plans of Venetian engineer and oltramarini officer Antonio Giancix (Antun Jančić) and built by French military engineer Pierre de la Salle. In 1715, it was captured by the Ottomans and remained under their control until 1822, when it was captured by the Greeks at the Siege of Nauplia (1822).

The eight bastions of the fortress were originally named after the Venetian provveditori, but when it fell to the Ottoman Empire, the bastions were given Turkish names. Lastly, when the Greeks overthrew the Turks, the bastions were renamed after ancient Greek leaders and heroes - Epaminondas, Miltiades, Leonidas, Phocion, Achilles, and Themistocles. The two remaining bastions were named after St. Andrew (Agios Andreas) and French Philhellene Robert, who died in battle on the Acropolis of Athens. The Miltiades bastion was used as a prison and among its walls was also held Theodoros Kolokotronis, hero of the Greek Revolution.

== Gallery ==
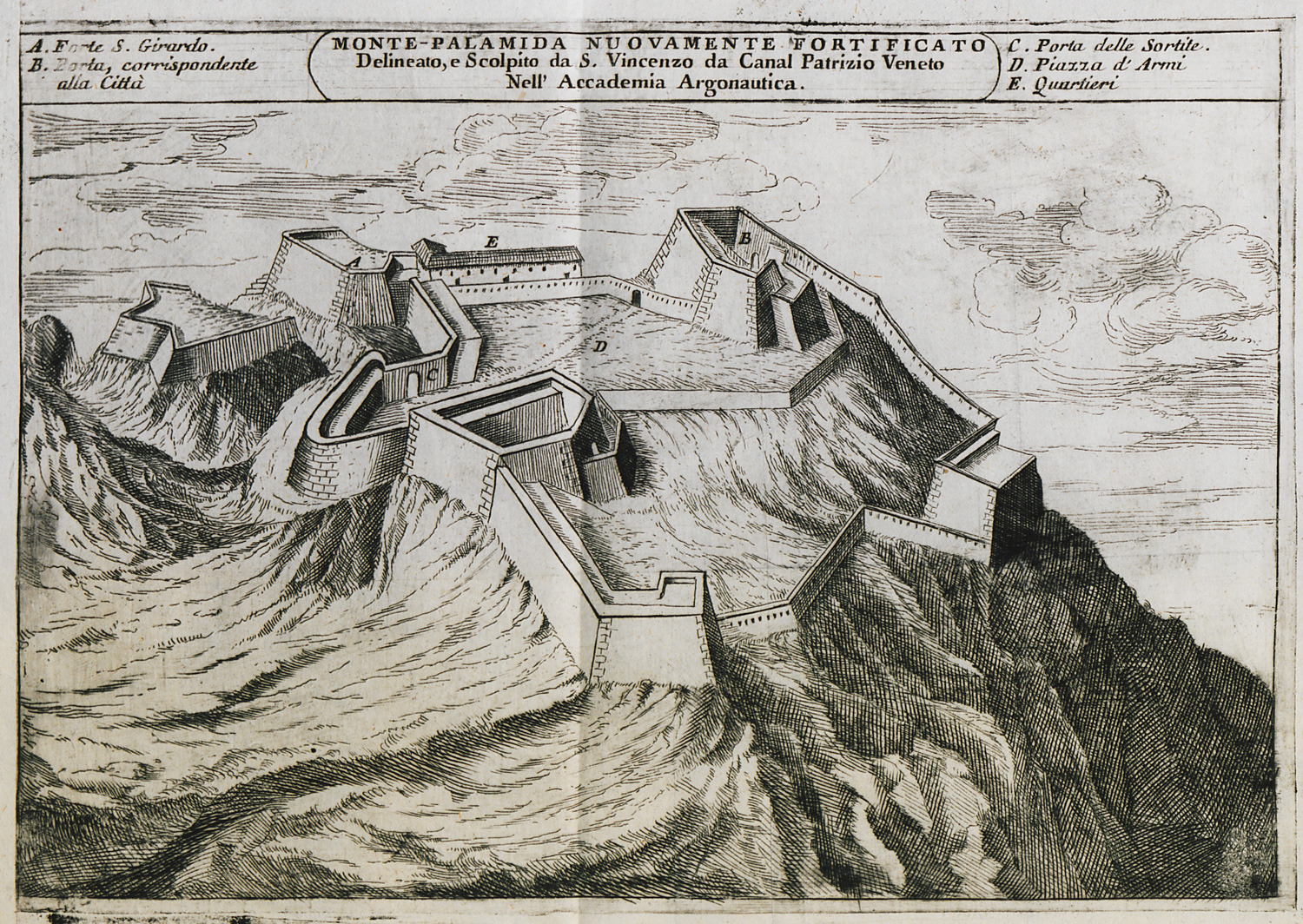
Sketch of Palamidi in 1708

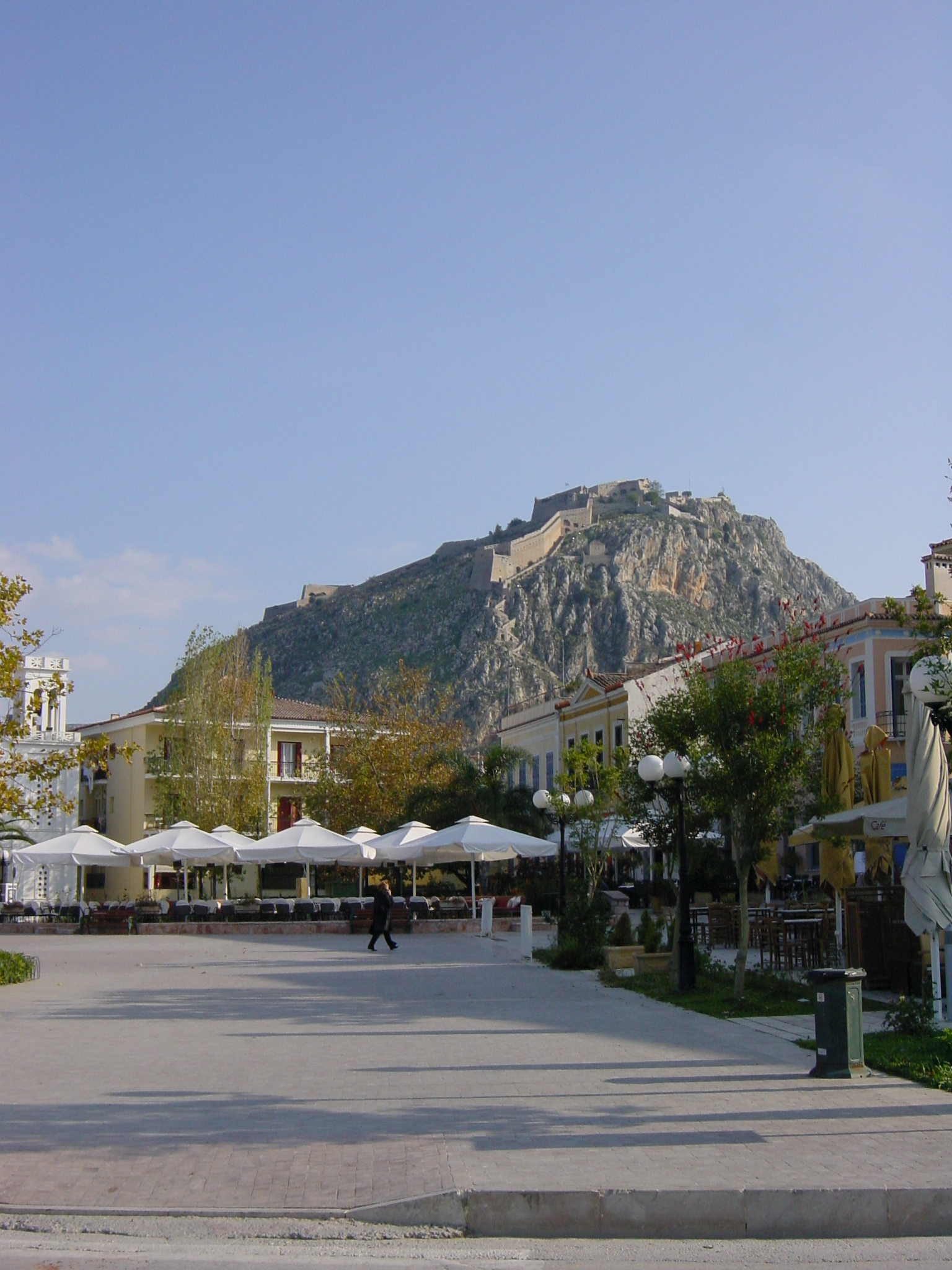
Palamidi Fortress seen from the Nafplio waterfront

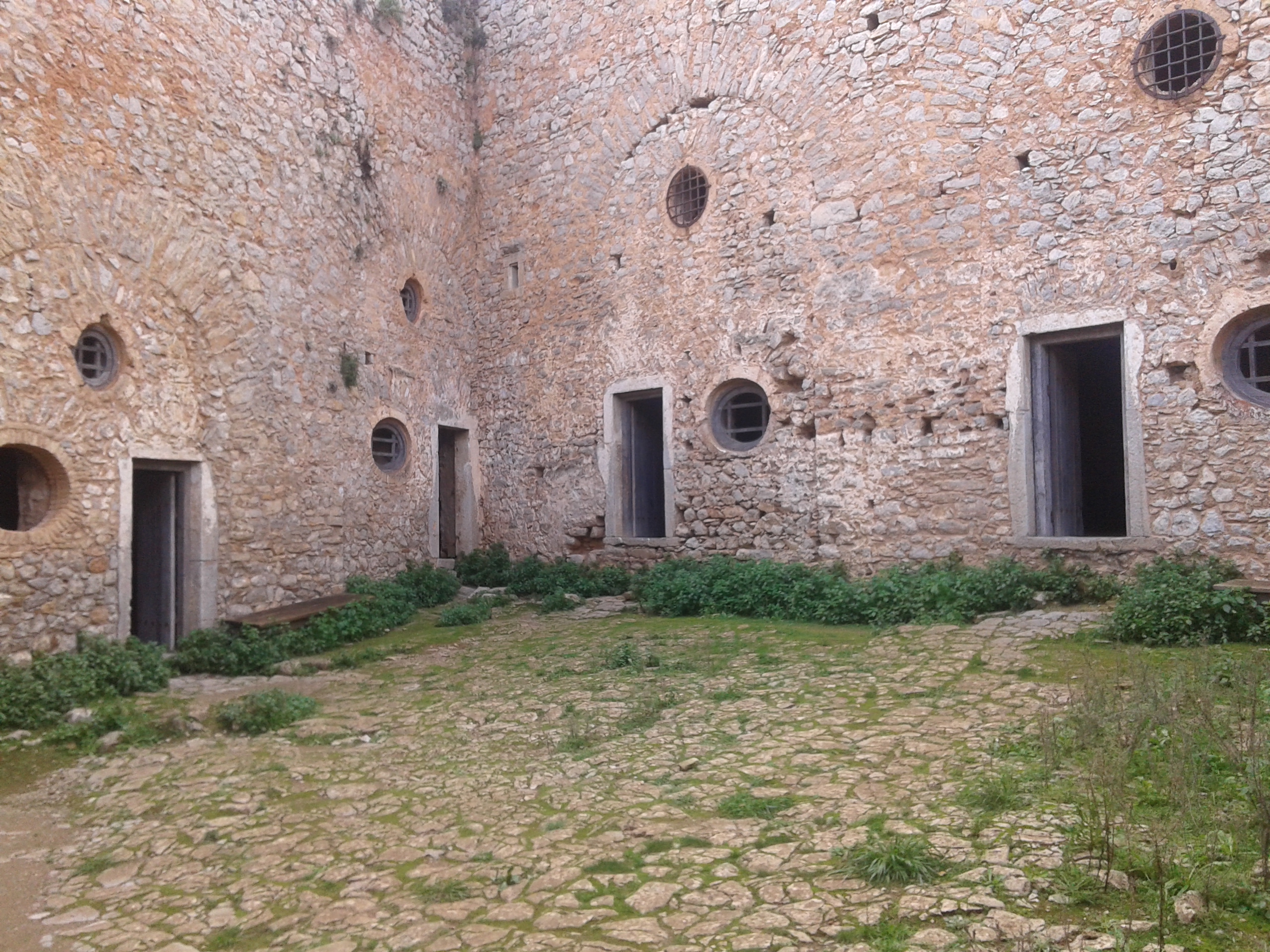
Interior

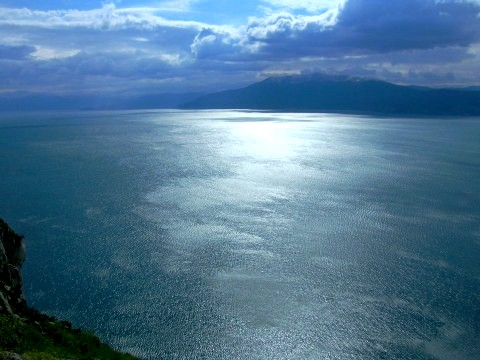
View of the Argolic Gulf from the Palamidi

Palamidi Fortress (2002)

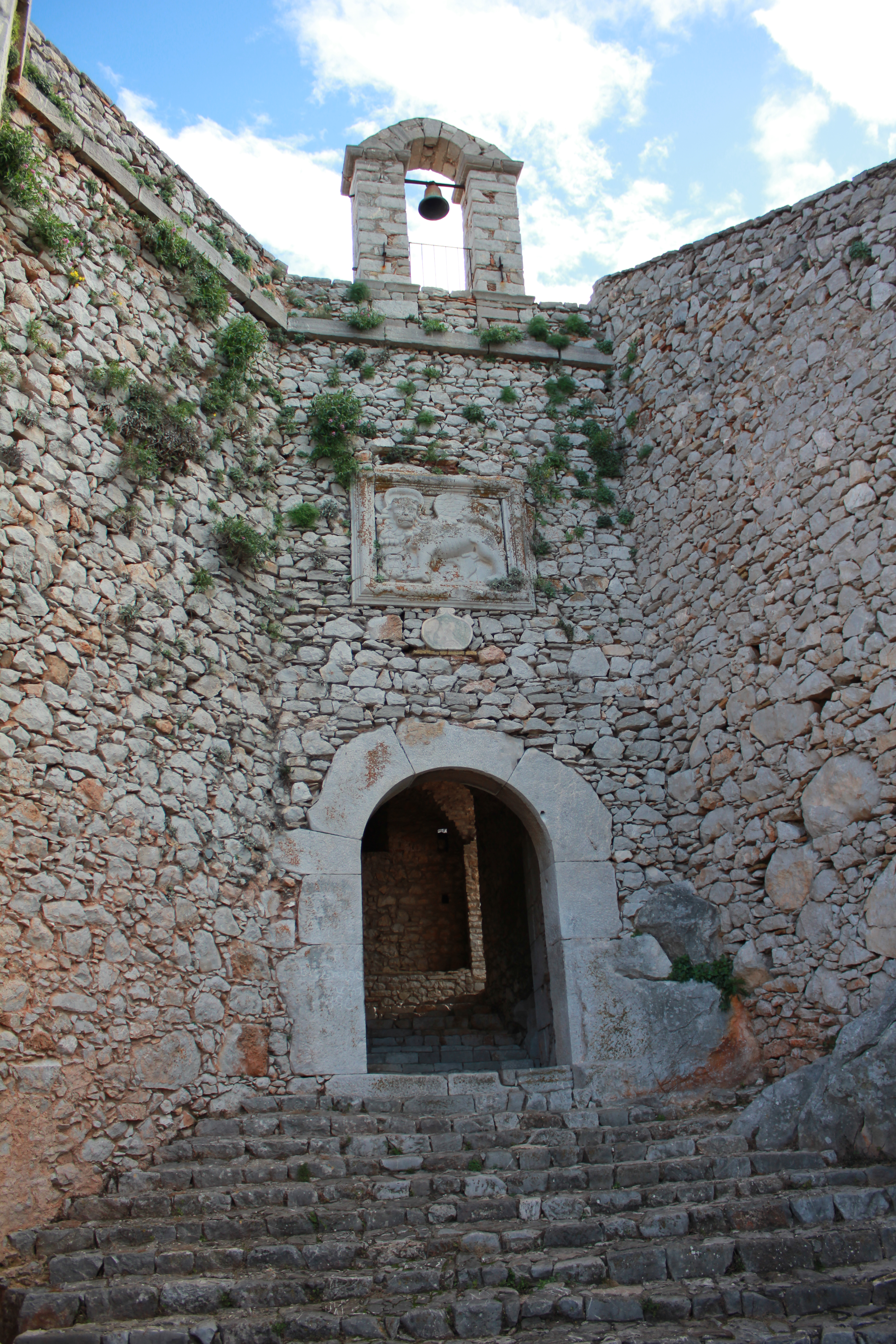
A gate inside the Palamidi, February 9, 2013.
