= Ottoman–Venetian wars =

Series of conflicts between the Republic of Venice and the Ottoman Empire from 1396 to 1718

The Ottoman–Venetian wars were a series of conflicts between the Ottoman Empire and the Republic of Venice that started in 1396 and lasted until 1718. It included:

- Venice's participation in the Crusade of Nicopolis in 1396
- A naval conflict in 1415–1419, the main event of which was the Battle of Gallipoli (1416)
- The Siege of Thessalonica (1422–1430), with Venice active from 1423 on, resulting in the capture of Thessalonica by the Ottomans
- The First Ottoman–Venetian War (1463–1479), resulting in the capture of Negroponte, Lemnos and Albania Veneta by the Ottomans
- The Second Ottoman–Venetian War (1499–1503), resulting in the capture of the Venetian strongholds in the Morea (Peloponnese) by the Ottomans
- The Third Ottoman–Venetian War (1537–1540), resulting in the capture of the Cyclades except Tinos, the Sporades and the last Venetian strongholds in the Morea (Peloponnese) by the Ottomans
- The Fourth Ottoman–Venetian War (1570–1573), resulting in the capture of Cyprus by the Ottomans, and the defeat of their fleet in the Battle of Lepanto (1571)
- The Fifth Ottoman–Venetian War or the Cretan War (1645–1669), resulting in the capture of Crete by the Ottomans
- The Sixth Ottoman–Venetian War or the Morean War (1684–1699), resulting in the capture of the Morea (Peloponnese), Lefkada, Aigina and parts of Dalmatia by Venice and the end of Ottoman dominance in the eastern Mediterranean Sea
- The Seventh and last Ottoman–Venetian War (1714–1718) (also called the Second Morean War or Sinj war), resulting in the recapture of the Morea (Peloponnese) and of Tinos and Aigina, the last Venetian holdings in the Aegean, by the Ottomans
