= Francesco Apostoli =

Italian writer and bureaucrat (1755–1816)

Francesco Apostoli (c. 1755 – February 1816) was an Italian bureaucrat and travel writer.

== Biography ==
Francesco was born a Venetian citizen, and as a young adult worked as a secretary in the Venetian republic. He however left his position and country and travelled to France and Germany. He befriended the Count Maximilian Joseph von Lamberg and stayed at his palace for over a year in Landshut. The Count, known as a writer, was helped by Apostoli to compile a second volume of his opus Le Memorial d'une Mondaine. Returning to Venice, he adopted the pseudonymous pen-name and published in 1777 idiosyncratic letters to Lozembrune (1751–1801) about travels under the title Lettres et Contes sentimentaux de George Wanderson. The text also contained two semi-autobiographic short novels: Storia di Andrea and Saggezza della follia. In 1782, he published Saggio per servire alla storia de'viaggi filosofici e de' principi viaggiatori. However a few years later, even though married, he embarked on more travels only to find himself upon returning to Venice, under suspicion for indiscreet communications with the Republican French ambassador of Genoa, Tilly, and in 1794, arrested and condemned to work in Corfu under the local provveditore. Widowed of his first wife, he remarried.

He moved to Milan there he was appointed by the newly formed Italian Republic as consul for Ancona. He did not reach that town, and was captured by the Austrian army and exiled to Dalmatia, he wrote about this imprisonment and exile in Lettere Sirmiensi per servire alla deportazione de' cittadini Cisalpini in Dalmazia ed Ungheria. In 1800, again in Milan, he published Rappresentazione del secolo XVIII. He was appointed as ambassador of the Republic of San Marino to the Napoleonic Government in Paris. His posting was not very happy: Piccola repubblica, piccolo rappresentate (small republic, small representative) he would tell those he met. In Paris, he composed l'Histoire de la révolution par un Étranger. This publication apparently angered the authorities, which forced him to leave France. In Italy, he obtained government positions in the police, including in Venice. He began to write Storia dei Galli, Franchi, e Francesi. He then obtained a post as inspector "partimentali" to a library and printing press of Padua. He began to write for the theater, writing two comedies: E tutto un momento and Merenda all Zuecca. He died poor in Venice.
