= List of ship launches in 1983 =

The list of ship launches in 1983 includes a chronological list of all ships launched in 1983.

| Date | Ship | Class / type | Builder | Location | Country | Notes |
|---|---|---|---|---|---|---|
| 2 January | Mercandian Admiral II | Type FV 1500 RoRo-ship | Frederikshavn Værft | Frederikshavn | Denmark | For Mercandia rederiet A/S |
| 15 January | Cessnock | Fremantle-class patrol boat | NQEA | Cairns, Queensland | Australia | |
| 17 January | Yorktown | Ticonderoga-class cruiser | Ingalls Shipbuilding | Pascagoula, Mississippi | United States | |
| 20 January | Nizhneyansk | SA-15 type cargo ship | Valmet Vuosaari shipyard | Helsinki | Finland | |
| 25 January | Yūbetsu | Yubari-class destroyer escort | | | Japan | |
| 27 January | Nadashio | Yūshio-class submarine | | | Japan | |
| 23 February | Igarka | SA-15 type cargo ship | Wärtsilä Perno shipyard | Turku | Finland | |
| 26 February | Carr | Oliver Hazard Perry-class frigate | Todd Pacific Shipyards | Seattle, Washington | United States | |
| 4 March | Rosales | Espora-class corvette | Río Santiago Shipyard | La Plata | Argentina | |
| 9 March | Bendigo | Fremantle-class patrol boat | NQEA | Cairns, Queensland | Australia | |
| 19 March | Minneapolis–Saint Paul | Los Angeles-class submarine | Electric Boat | Groton, Connecticut | United States | |
| 26 March | Admiral Tributs | Udaloy-class destroyer | Zhdanov Shipyard | Leningrad | Soviet Union | |
| 26 March | Mersey Venture | Dredger | Appledore Shipbuilders Ltd. | Appledore | United Kingdom | For Mersey Docks and Harbour Board . |
| 28 March | British Success | Tanker | Harland & Wolff | Belfast | United Kingdom | For BP Shipping. |
| 14 April | Edinburgh | Type 42 destroyer | Cammell Laird | Birkenhead | United Kingdom | |
| 15 April | Mercandian Diplomat | Type FV 1500 RoRo-ship | Frederikshavn Værft | Frederikshavn | Denmark | For K/S Merc-Scandia XXXII P/R |
| 16 April | Stena Germanica | ferry | Stocznia im Lenina | Gdańsk | Poland | For Stena Line |
| 23 April | Nicholas | Oliver Hazard Perry-class frigate | Bath Iron Works | Bath, Maine | United States | |
| 29 April | Thomson | Type 209 submarine | Howaldtswerke-Deutsche Werft | Kiel | West Germany | For Armada de Chile |
| 30 April | Olympia | Los Angeles-class submarine | Newport News Shipbuilding | Newport News, Virginia | United States | |
| 18 May | Kalaat Beni Hammad | Landing ship | Brooke Marine Ltd. | Lowestoft | United Kingdom | For Algerian Navy. |
| 1 June | Monchegorsk | SA-15 type cargo ship | Wärtsilä Perno shipyard | Turku | Finland | |
| 10 June | Whidbey Island | Whidbey Island-class dock landing ship | Lockheed Shipbuilding | Seattle, Washington | United States | |
| 11 June | Giuseppe Garibaldi | Light V/STOL aircraft carrier | Fincantieri | Monfalcone | Italy | |
| 24 June | Spiro | Espora-class corvette | Río Santiago Shipyard | La Plata | Argentina | |
| 9 July | Gawler | Fremantle-class patrol boat | NQEA | Cairns, Queensland | Australia | |
| 10 July | Mercandian Prince II | Type FV 1500 RoRo-ship | Frederikshavn Værft | Frederikshavn | Denmark | For K/S Merc-Scandia XXXV |
| 14 July | Arkhangelsk | SA-15 type cargo ship | Wärtsilä Perno shipyard | Turku | Finland | |
| 15 July | Mercandian Senator | Type FV 1500 RoRo-ship | Frederikshavn Værft | Frederikshavn | Denmark | For K/S Merc-Scandia XXXIV |
| 16 July | Rentz | Oliver Hazard Perry-class frigate | Todd Pacific Shipyards | San Pedro, California | United States | |
| 29 July | Simpson | Type 209 submarine | Howaldtswerke-Deutsche Werft | Kiel | West Germany | For Armada de Chile |
| 13 August | Robert G. Bradley | Oliver Hazard Perry-class frigate | Bath Iron Works | Bath, Maine | United States | |
| 20 August | Vogtland | Ohre-class barracks ship | VEB Peene-Werft | Wolgast | East Germany | For Volksmarine |
| 27 August | Augusta | Los Angeles-class submarine | Electric Boat | Groton, Connecticut | United States | |
| 27 August | Hyman G. Rickover | Los Angeles-class submarine | Electric Boat | Groton, Connecticut | United States | |
| 6 September | Haruyuki | Hatsuyuki-class destroyer | | | Japan | |
| 14 September | Schuja | Tarantul-class corvette | Sredne-Newski | Leningrad | Soviet Union | |
| 19 September | Isoyuki | Hatsuyuki-class destroyer | | | Japan | |
| 24 September | Honolulu | Los Angeles-class submarine | Newport News Shipbuilding | Newport News, Virginia | United States | |
| 7 October | Fort Good Hope | Offshore supply vessel | Goole Shipbuilding & Repairing Co. Ltd. | Goole | United Kingdom | For Townsend Holdings Ltd. |
| 15 October | Henry M. Jackson | Ohio-class submarine | Electric Boat | Groton, Connecticut | United States | |
| 22 October | Geraldton | Fremantle-class patrol boat | NQEA | Cairns, Queensland | Australia | |
| 22 October | XXX Aniversario | Dredger | Appledore Shipbuilders Ltd. | Appledore | United Kingdom | For Cuban Government. |
| 5 November | Taylor | Oliver Hazard Perry-class frigate | Bath Iron Works | Bath, Maine | United States | |
| 11 November | Sokol | Koni-class frigate | Werft 129 | Selenodolsk | Soviet Union | For Soviet Navy |
| 15 November | Amderma | SA-15 type cargo ship | Wärtsilä Perno shipyard | Turku | Finland | |
| 16 November | Doğanay | Type 209 submarine | Marinewerft | Gölcük | Turkey | For Turkish Naval Forces |
| 19 November | Brave | Type 22 frigate | Yarrow Shipbuilders | Glasgow | United Kingdom | |
| 19 November | Gary | Oliver Hazard Perry-class frigate | Todd Pacific Shipyards | San Pedro, California | United States | |
| 24 November | Kemerovo | SA-15 type cargo ship | Valmet Vuosaari shipyard | Helsinki | Finland | |
| 2 December | Isle of Arran | Ferry | Ferguson Ailsa Ltd | Port Glasgow | United Kingdom | For Caledonian MacBrayne |
| 16 December | Mercandian Queen II | Type FV 1500 RoRo-ship | Frederikshavn Værft | Frederikshavn | Denmark | For K/S Merc-Scandia XXXVI |
| 17 December | Mellum | Multi-purpose vessel | Elsflether Werft | Elsfleth | West Germany | For Federal Ministry of Transport and Digital Infrastructure |
| 19 December | Eithne | Eithne-class patrol vessel | Verolme Dockyard | Rushbrook | Ireland | For Irish Naval Service |
| Date unknown | Changzheng 3 | Type 091 nuclear-powered attack submarine | Huludao Shipyard | Huludao, Liaoning Province | China | |
| Date unknown | Okha | SA-15 type cargo ship | Valmet Vuosaari shipyard | Helsinki | Finland | |
| Date unknown | Bratsk | SA-15 type cargo ship | Valmet Vuosaari shipyard | Helsinki | Finland | |
| Date unknown | Calypso | Passenger launch | David Abels Boatbuilders Ltd. | Bristol | United Kingdom | For private owner. |
| Unknown date | El Mourakeb | Patrol boat | Brooke Marine Ltd. | Lowestoft | United Kingdom | For Algerian Navy. |
| Date unknown | Gordano | Workboat | David Abels Boatbuilders Ltd. | Bristol | United Kingdom | For Bristol Port Co. |
| Date unknown | Kola | SA-15 type cargo ship | Wärtsilä Perno shipyard | Turku | Finland | |
| Date unknown | Mariner | Launch | David Abels Boatbuilders Ltd. | Bristol | United Kingdom | For Bristol City Council. |
| Date unknown | Tiksi | SA-15 type cargo ship | Wärtsilä Perno shipyard | Turku | Finland | |
