= MV Monchegorsk =

Monchegorsk has been a name of the following vessels:

- MV Monchegorsk (1983), a SA-15 type Arctic cargo ship
- MV Monchegorsk (2008), a double acting ship owned by Norilsk Nickel
