= SA-15 (ship type) =

Class of ice-breaking cargo ships

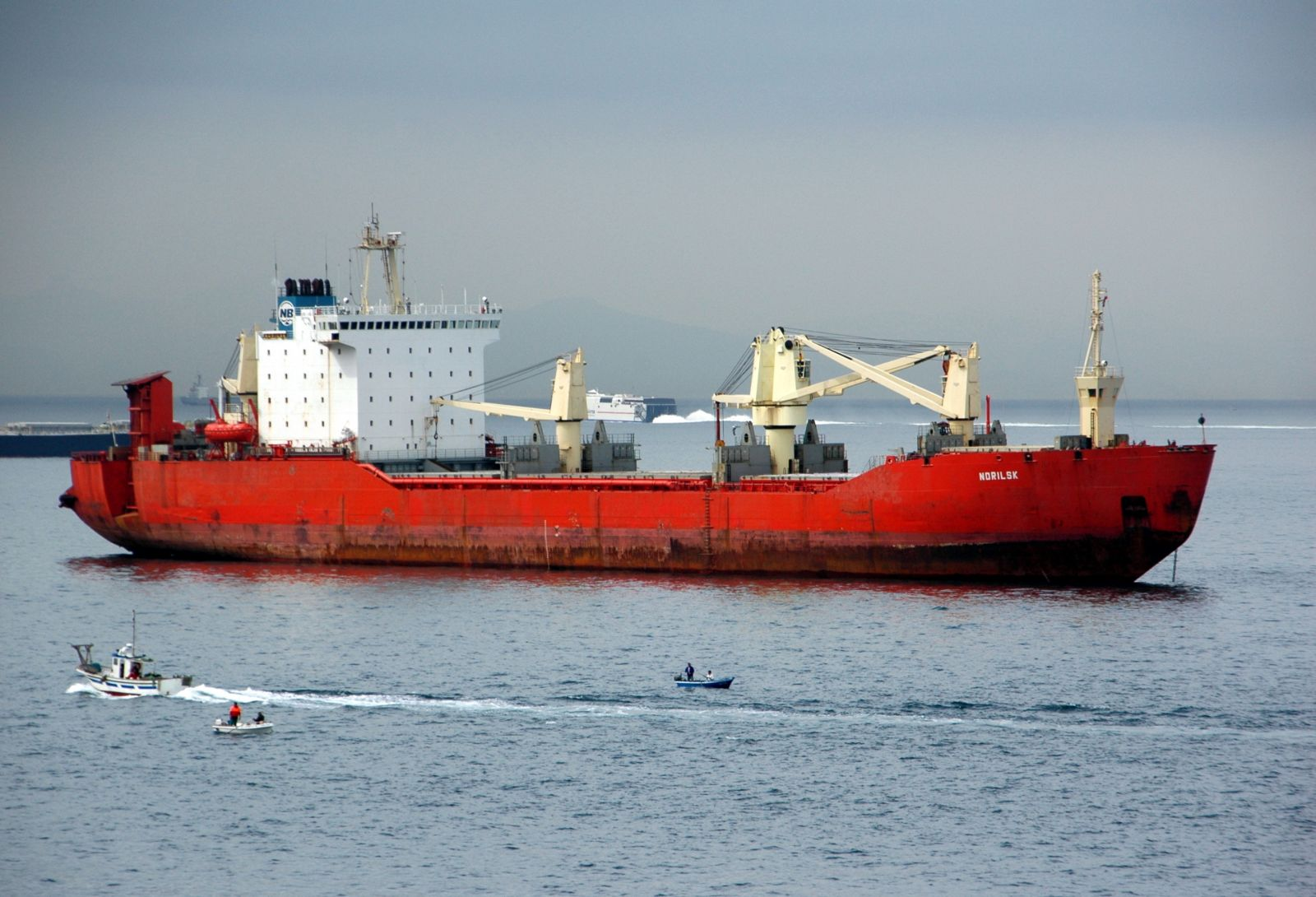
- The first SA-15 type cargo ship, Norilsk.

Class overview
- Builders: Oy Wärtsilä Ab, Turku, Finland; Valmet Oy, Helsinki, Finland; Wärtsilä Marine, Helsinki, Finland
- Operators: Murmansk Shipping Company; Far East Shipping Company; Sakhalin Shipping Company; NB Shipping; Bank Line
- Subclasses: SA-15 Super
- Built: 1982–1987
- In service: 1982–
- Completed: 19
- Active: 2
- Scrapped: 17

General characteristics (SA-15)
- Type: Ro-ro/General cargo ship
- Tonnage: 16,500 GT; 11,000 NT; 20,000 DWT (summer); 14,700 DWT (Arctic)
- Length: 177.20 m (581 ft 4 in) (overall, maximum); 173.55 m (569 ft 5 in) (overall, hull); 164.10 m (538 ft 5 in) (waterline); 159.6 m (523 ft 7 in) (between perpendiculars)
- Beam: 24.55 m (80 ft 7 in)
- Height: 51.50 m (169 ft 0 in) from keel
- Draught: 11.35 m (37 ft 3 in) (summer); 9.00 m (29 ft 6 in) (Arctic); 8.50 m (27 ft 11 in) (design)
- Depth: 15.2 m (49 ft 10 in)
- Ramps: Stern quarter ramp on starboard side
- Ice class: ULA
- Installed power: 2 × Wärtsilä-Sulzer 14ZV40/48 (2 × 7,700 kW)
- Propulsion: Single shaft; KaMeWa CPP, ⌀ 5.6 m (18 ft 4 in)
- Speed: 17 knots (31 km/h; 20 mph) (design)
- Range: 16,000 nautical miles (30,000 km; 18,000 mi)
- Endurance: 60 days
- Crew: Accommodation for 42
- Notes: As designed; minor differences between ships as well as with SA-15 Super

SA-15 is the project name for a series of icebreaking multipurpose cargo ships built in Finland for the Soviet Union in the 1980s. The ships, capable of independent operation in all prevailing arctic ice conditions, were the first merchant vessels designed for year-round operations in the Northern Sea Route. For this purpose they have hulls that resemble those of polar icebreakers and propulsion systems capable of withstanding ice loads.

While the ships are also known as the Norilsk class after the first ship, Norilsk, they are usually referred to by their project name which denotes a subarctic 15,000 DWT cargo ship. Nineteen SA-15 type ships were delivered by Finnish shipbuilders Wärtsilä and Valmet in 1982–1987, and two vessels remain in service as of 2025.

== History ==
Maintaining year-round traffic in the Northern Sea Route, especially between Murmansk and Dudinka that were the most important ports in the Soviet arctic region, had always been a high priority to the Soviet Union due to the economic exploitation of the vast natural resources of the northern regions. Northern Sea Route is also a potentially important link between Europe and Asia as it significantly reduces the transit time in comparison to the route through the Suez Canal. While the Soviet Union had constructed a large fleet of ice-strengthened cargo ships, they could not keep up with the large nuclear-powered icebreakers and were often damaged by ice during towing operations. In order to prevent this, a fundamentally new type of cargo ship was needed.

In the late 1970s Sudoimport, the Soviet foreign trade organization with a monopoly for the foreign trade of ships, requested for tenders for the design and construction of 20,000 DWT arctic cargo ships according to the specifications laid out by the Ministry of the Merchant Marine of the Soviet Union (MORFLOT). In terms of hull strength and engine power, these ships were to be in par with icebreakers that would escort them through the most difficult ice conditions.

=== Development and construction ===
Leading Finnish shipbuilders Wärtsilä and Valmet both developed designs that met the requirements for the new class of arctic cargo ships capable of year-round operation in the Northern Sea Route, Wärtsilä using knowledge and experience gained from building more than half of the world's icebreaker fleet in service at that time and Valmet from several types of ice strengthened cargo ships the company had built in the 1960s and 1970s, and an initial order for nine ships, six for Wärtsilä for FIM 1.2 billion and three for Valmet for FIM 600 million, was placed in July 1980. Wärtsilä's order was the largest single contract made by a Finnish industrial company. In the following year three more ships were ordered from Wärtsilä and two from Valmet, resulting in a total order of 14 ships worth of FIM 3.5 billion.

While initially the idea of ordering two similar but technically different series of ships for the same purpose was to gain operational experience for the future arctic freighters, shortly after the deal was made public the shipyards approached Sudoimport to agree on a uniform design. Not only was running two parallel development projects wasting effort and resources for the shipyards, but constructing a single type of ships instead of two would bring savings to the customer in form of reduced maintenance and spare part costs. Wärtsilä's design was chosen as the standard for further development since it was ahead in the production schedule. However, despite the co-operative measures some dissimilarities between the ships built by Wärtsilä and Valmet remained, resulting in the crews considering of them as separate types of ships as the differences were most obvious from the operator's point of view.

The first ship of the class, Norilsk from Wärtsilä, was delivered on 13 November 1982 from the Perno shipyard in Turku, half a year behind schedule due to the prototype nature in many of its systems. The first ship from Valmet, Nizhneyansk, was delivered from the Vuosaari shipyard in Helsinki on 21 January 1983, about three months ahead of the contracted delivery time. The remaining twelve ships, all named after cities within the Soviet Union, were delivered in 1983–1984.

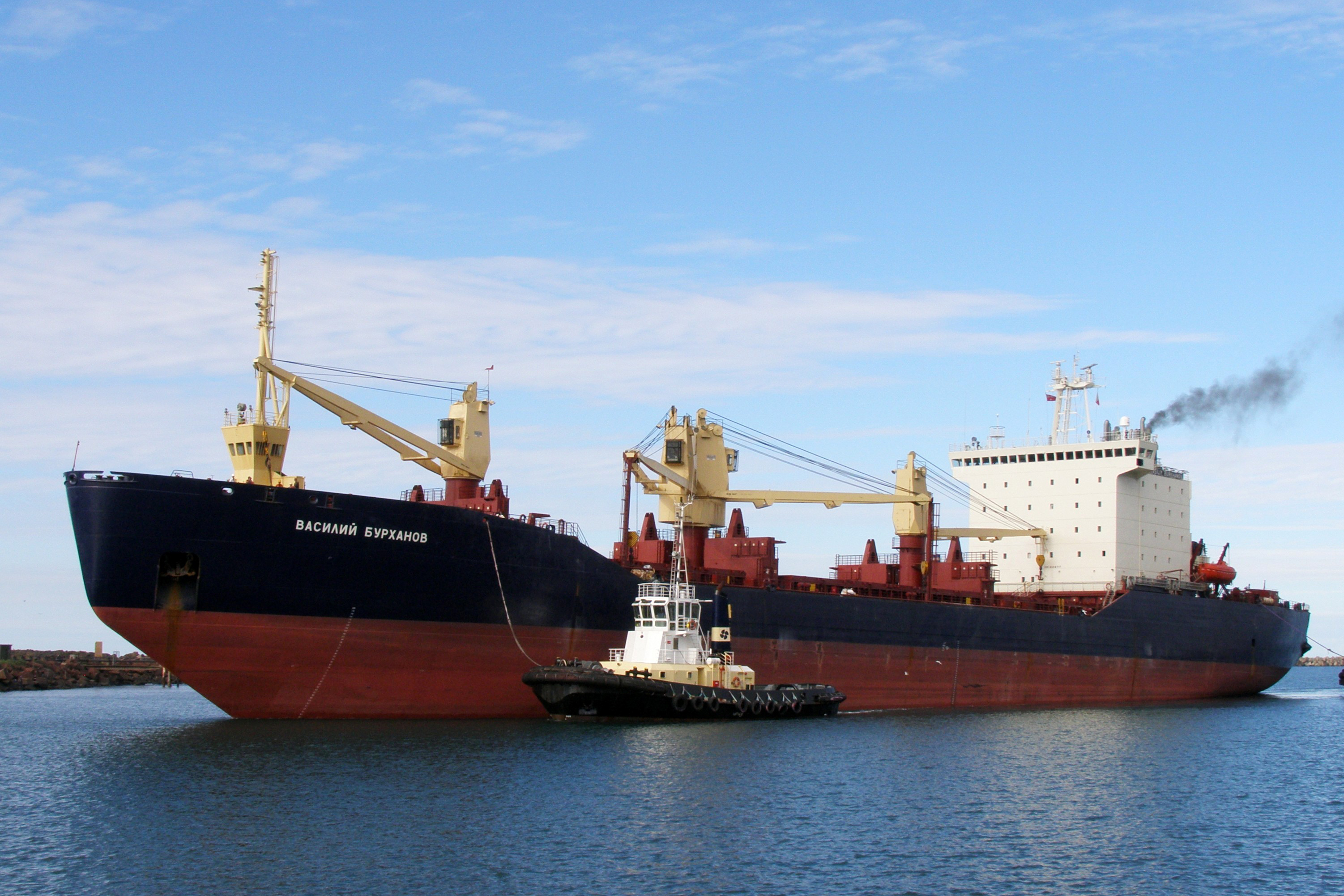
Vasiliy Burkhanov, one of the five slightly different SA-15 Super type ships that were ordered from Valmet in 1984. However, major features such as the icebreaker bow remained the same.

Shortly after the last SA-15 type ships of the initial order, Anadyr from Valmet and Nikel from Wärtsilä, were delivered on 23 and 30 March 1984, respectively, Valmet received a follow-up order from Sudoimport for five more ships of the same type. The contract, finalized on 13 July 1984, was worth of FIM 1.5 billion (US$263M) and was the biggest single order ever received by Valmet. Minor modifications were made to the design based on the operator's experiences during the exceptionally hard arctic winter, resulting in a subclass sometimes referred to as SA-15 Super. The ships, named after Russian and Soviet explorers, were built in 1985–1987 and the final ship, Kapitan Danilkin, was delivered on 17 June. At that time, Valmet was already part of Wärtsilä Marine and a decision had been made to close the Vuosaari shipyard.

=== Operational history ===
While the first ships suffered from prototype problems with e.g. the propeller pitch control mechanism and returned to the shipyard for repairs under warranty, the feedback from the operators was generally positive from the beginning especially regarding the performance of the ships in difficult ice conditions which was deemed superior to earlier ULA class freighters. The vessels were capable of breaking level ice up to 1.1 metres (3.6 ft) in thickness while maintaining a speed of 1–2 knots and proceed in even thicker ice by ramming.

Later reports state that the ships could maintain an average speed of 6 knots in winter and 12 knots in summer while operating in the Northern Sea Route and were capable of continuously breaking 80 cm (31 in) ice at five knots. With assistance from Arktika-class nuclear icebreakers the ships could operate in level ice with thickness of 2 metres (6.6 ft) at two knots under their own power without towing, but if the freighter is attached to the icebreaker's stern notch for close towing, the combination could maintain a speed of four knots in similar ice conditions, the same as the speed of the icebreaker when operating alone.

The strength of the SA-15 type ships was further proven when icebreaker Admiral Makarov, after having been immobilized for five days, pushed the freshly delivered Nizhneyansk at full power through the ice separating the vessels from Pevek, arriving at the city as the first ships of the year 1983. The freighter received only minor ice damage in the process. During the particularly difficult season, during which around fifty cargo ships were trapped in ice in the East Siberian Sea, the SA-15 type freighters were sent to the Northern Sea Route as soon as they were delivered from the Finnish shipyards. They were used to unload cargo from icebound ships and deliver the much-needed supplies to isolated communities along the coast. The ships also acted as escort icebreakers, using their stern notches to tow smaller ships through the ice fields even though it was not their original purpose. Among the ships that received assistance from the new SA-15 type ships was the nuclear icebreaker Sibir which had to be helped on several occasions by Okha. Unlike the freighters, the icebreaker had no abrasion-resistant coating and suffered from severe hull corrosion that considerably increased the ice resistance of the vessel.

==== Initial Soviet and Russian owners ====
The largest initial operator was Murmansk Shipping Company (MSCO) which owned and operated a fleet of ten SA-15 type cargo ships in the western part of the Soviet arctic. It was followed by two companies operating in the eastern regions, Far East Shipping Company (FESCO) with seven and Sakhalin Shipping Company with two vessels. Later MSCO transferred three ships to its affiliate, NB Shipping, and the ships were transferred from Russian to Cypriot register.

During the summer sailing season, the ships carried cargo along the Northern Sea Route, supplying the settlements and mining colonies on the East Siberian coast, and made several transit voyages from Europe to the Far East and Canada, each 25-day voyage taking around ten days less than a similar voyage through the Suez Canal. In winter the SA-15 type freighters mainly supported the Norilsk-Dudinka operation, providing a continuous flow of non-ferrous metal concentrates to the smelters of the Kola Peninsula and other industries within the Soviet Union, but also carried other cargo especially when the ice conditions became too difficult for other vessels. In 1990, Norilsk became the first ship to transport cargo from Japan to Europe via the Northern Sea Route. To promote the utilization of the Northern Sea Route, cargo space on board the SA-15 type ships was also leased to Western shipping companies and several experimental voyages for scientific purposes were made in the 1990s. For years the SA-15 type ships formed the core of the Soviet and later Russian fleet of icebreaking cargo ships.

Kapitan Man, one of the later SA-15 Super type freighters, was involved in the Strait of Juan de Fuca laser incident on 4 April 1997.

In 2009, Igarka was used as a setting for the opening scene of the 2010 action movie The Expendables while the ship was staying at Rio de Janeiro, Brazil, for repair work. Although the SA-15 type ship owned by the Far East Shipping Company is not identified in the movie, both its name and the company logo are briefly visible in some shots.

==== Bank Line ====
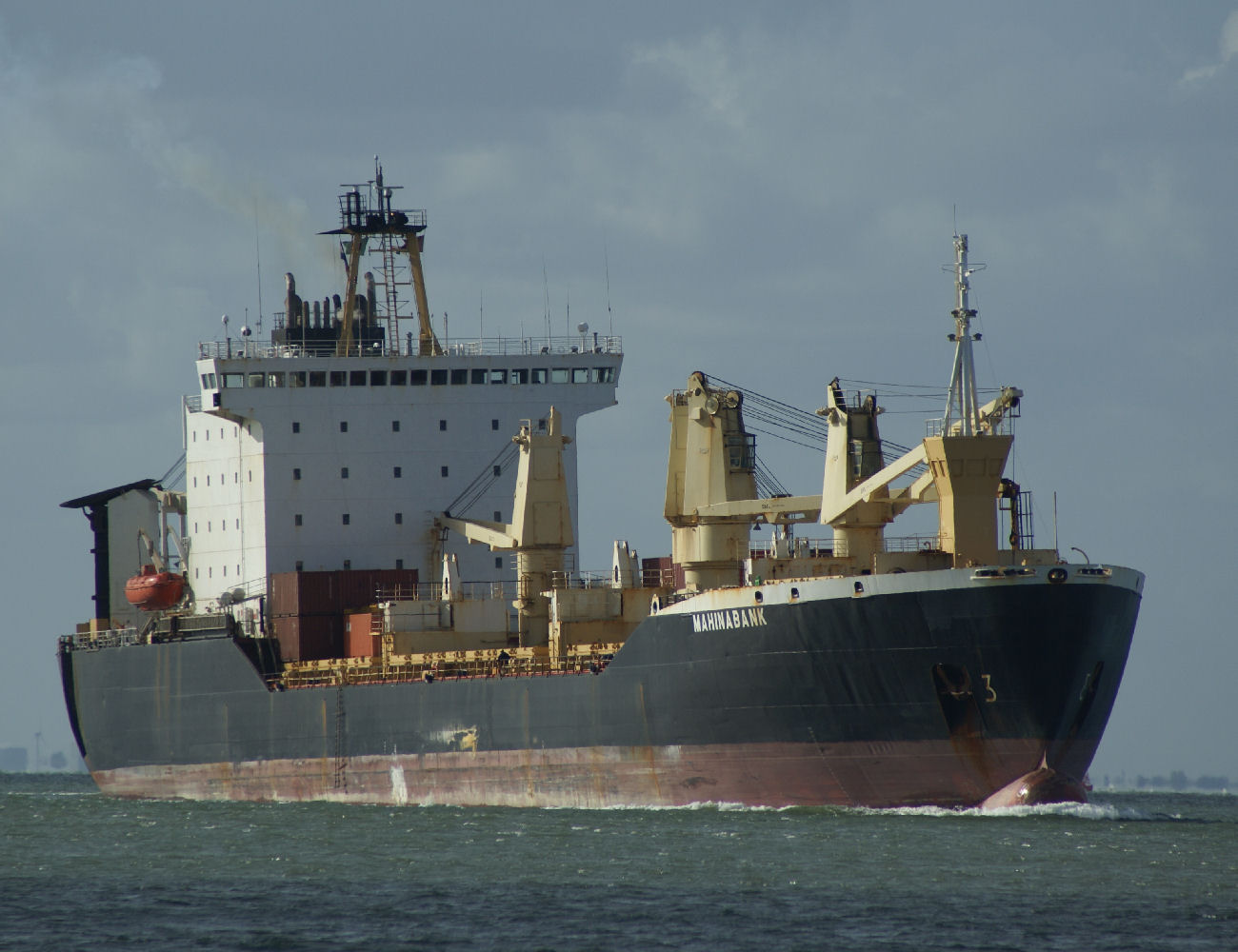
Mahinabank at Terneuzen, Netherlands, on 4 September 2007, showing the retrofitted bulbous bow.

In 1995 Bank Line, a subsidiary of Andrew Weir Shipping Ltd, purchased four SA-15 type ships, Okha, Bratsk, Tiksi and Nikel, for their westbound round-the-world liner service linking Europe to the South Pacific Islands and Papua New Guinea via the Panama and Suez Canals. The ships, no longer required to sail in the arctic conditions, were renamed Speybank, Arunbank, Foylebank and Teignbank and converted in the United Kingdom for the South Pacific service. In 2006 China Navigation Co Ltd, the deep-sea shipping arm of John Swire & Sons Ltd, bought the business from Andrew Weir Shipping. The ships, while still managed by Bank Line, were time chartered, renamed to Mahinabank, Tikeibank, Gazellebank and Boularibank, and sent to Singapore for drydocking and extensive refits. Later the company also chartered two more SA-15 type ships, Anatoliy Kolesnichenko and Vasiliy Burkhanov, but unlike the others they were not rebuilt and retained their Russian identity. However, due to the economic downturn of 2009 the round-the-world cargo liner service was discontinued, the charters were ended, and the four converted SA-15 type ships were returned to their original owner and sold for scrap in late 2009.

The end of Bank Line's SA-15 type ships was not without incident. On 28 April 2009, on her last complete voyage in round-the-world service, Boularibank was attacked by Somalian pirates 120 miles northeast of Socotra Island at the entrance to the Gulf of Aden. Unable to outrun the attackers, Captain Peter Stapleton carried out evasive manoeuvres while under fire from the assailants' AK-47s and RPGs and had his crew ward off the invaders using water cannons, twistlocks and heavy balks of timber lashed to the guard rails. By the time a destroyer of the Russian Navy arrived at the scene the pirates had given up, leaving Boularibank's crew of 31, eleven passengers and the captain's wife unharmed. Stapleton was later awarded the Merchant Navy Medal for exceptional bravery during the attack.

Another converted SA-15 type ship, Foylebank, was briefly featured in the 2000 drama film Cast Away as the ship that rescues the character portrayed by Tom Hanks.

==== Other operators ====
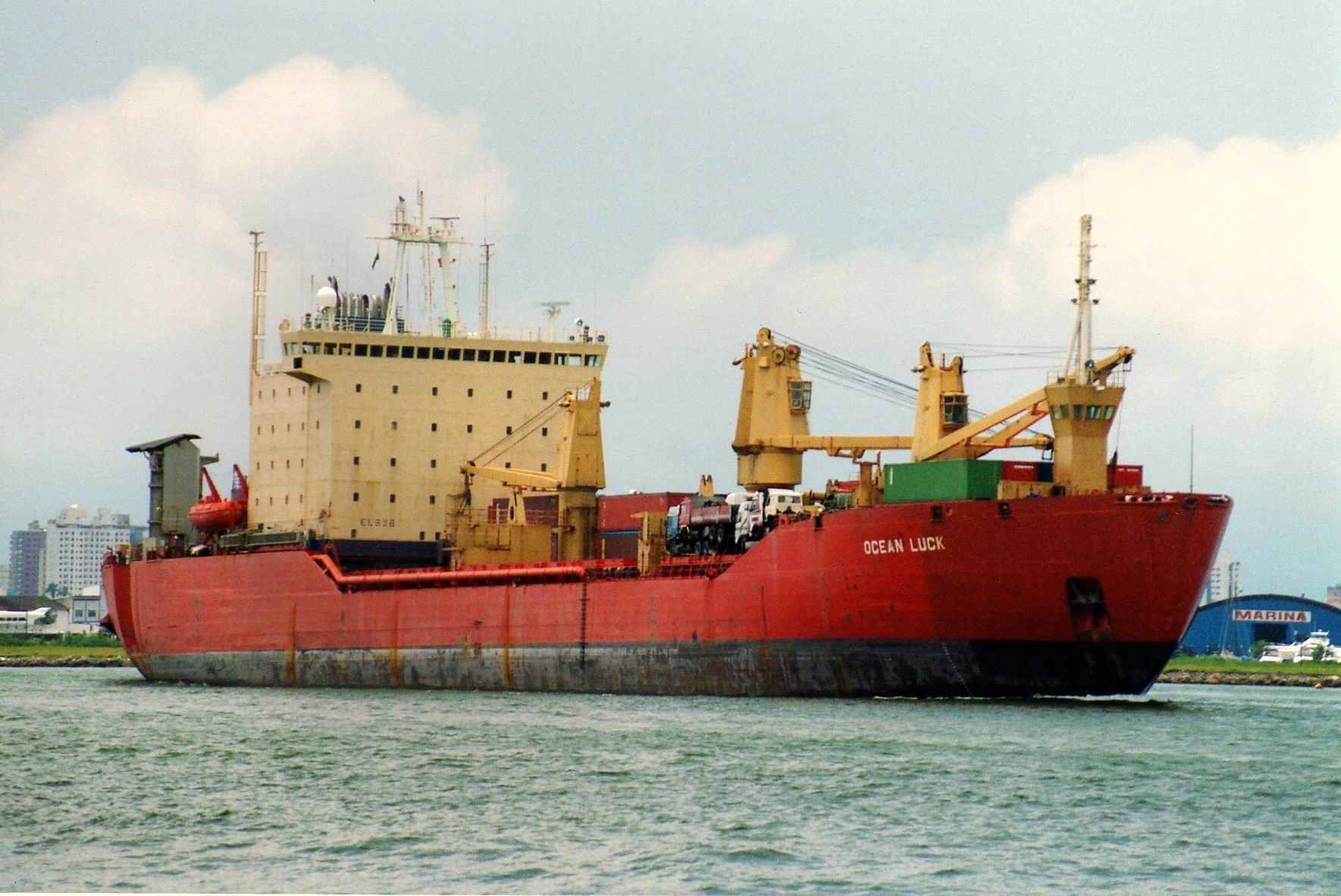
Ocean Luck (formerly Magdalena Oldendorff and Nizhneyansk, later Captain Kurbatskiy) in the Port of Santos in São Paulo, Brazil on 24 January 2005.

While the majority of existing SA-15 type ships has always remained under Russian ownership, in addition to the four ships operated by Bank Line several SA-15 type freighters have found their way to the second-hand market since the 1990s and several were sold to non-Russian owners.

In 1996 Nizhneyansk was sold to a Liberian company Bandwidth Shipping Corporation and renamed Magdalena Oldendorff. Operated by a German shipping company Oldendorff Carriers, a subsidiary of Egon Olderdorff, the ship was chartered in 2000 as a support ship for the 20th Indian Antarctic Expedition. On 11 June 2002 Magdalena Oldendorff, while on her second voyage to the Maitri Base, was immobilized by pack ice. 79 Russian scientists and 11 crew members were airlifted by helicopters to the South African research ship S. A. Agulhas and returned to Cape Town. After an unsuccessful rescue attempt by the Argentine icebreaker Almirante Irízar in late August a decision was made for the ship to winter in the Bay of Muskegbukta and attempt to free itself when the ice started to melt with the beginning of the Antarctic summer. In late November Magdalena Oldendorff freed itself and returned to Cape Town for the Christmas. The ship was sold in 2003 and renamed Ocean Luck, but since 2010 it sailed again under Russian ownership as Captain Kurbatskiy. The ship was in news again in June 2011 when four crew members died after consuming alcohol that turned out to be methanol. Captain Kurbatskiy was sold for scrap in late 2011.

In early 2009 another SA-15 type ship, the Monchegorsk, became the centre of an international incident involving Iran, Egypt, Russia, the United States, Israel, the Palestinian territories and Cyprus. American naval ships of the Combined Task Force 151 alerted the Egyptian officials after the ship left an Iranian port and headed for the Suez Canal. The ship was forced into an Egyptian port and munitions, believed to be headed to the Gaza Strip, were found hidden in the cargo. However, the officials had no evidence that this was in violation of the United Nations Security Council Resolution 1747, which prohibits Iran from exporting weapons, and the ship was released. After leaving the Canal Monchegorsk, flying a Cypriot flag, was boarded and escorted to the Port of Limassol. This resulted in a diplomatic struggle in which Israel and the US maintained that the shipment was in violation of the UN resolution, Israel claimed that the weapons were heading for the Palestinian organizations in the Gaza strip and Iran denied everything. The Cypriot officials made a decision to unload the suspicious cargo of 98 containers from the ship and keep it in Cyprus. The ship was sold for scrap shortly after the incident. On 11 July 2011, more than two years later, the confiscated containers, stored in the open under allegedly inappropriate conditions at the Evangelos Florakis Naval Base near Mari, exploded, leaving 12 people dead and 62 injured. The explosion created a 600-metre (1,969 ft) crater and caused widespread damage to the naval base and the nearby power station of Vasilikos.

=== Future ===
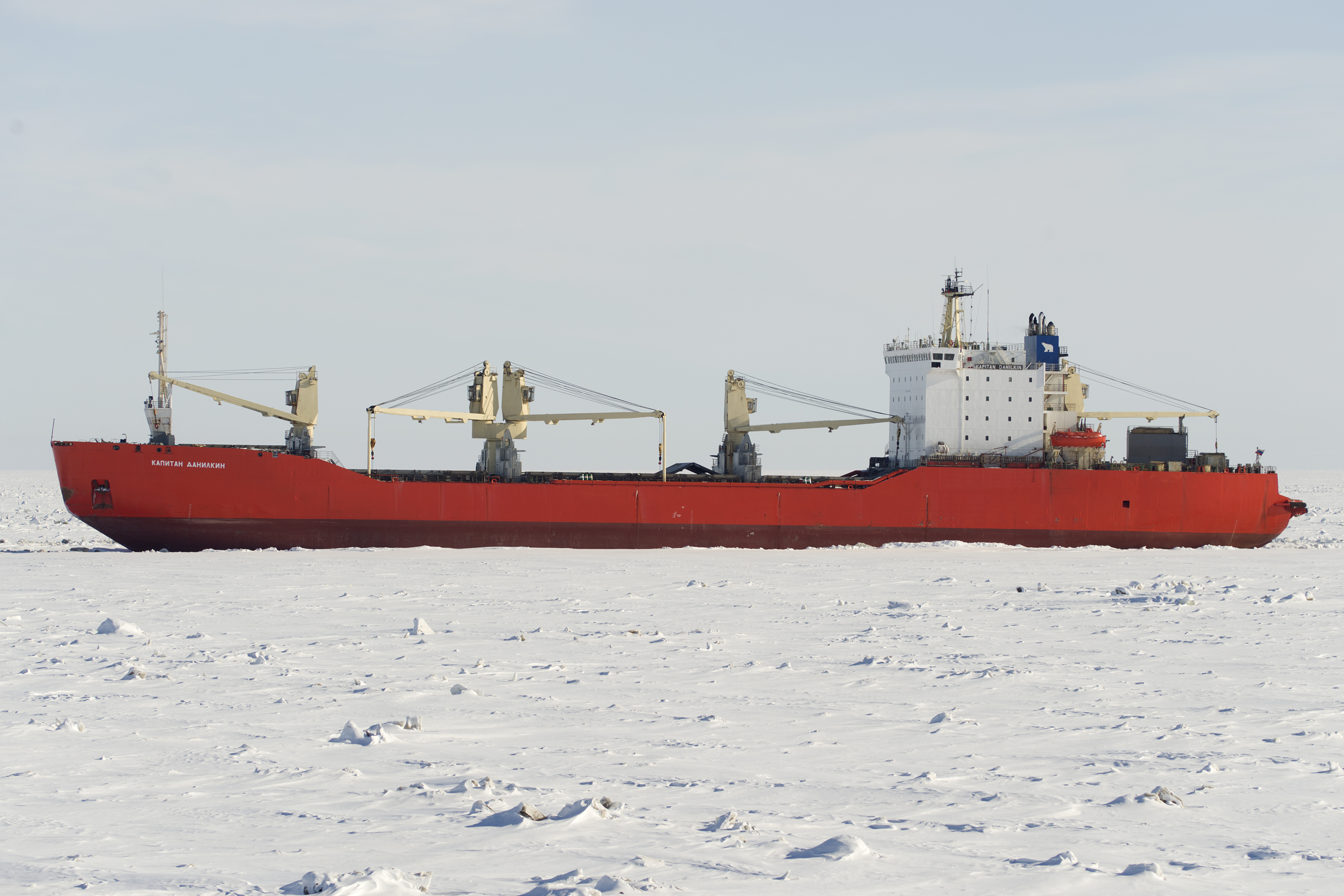
Kapitan Danilkin, photographed outside the port of Sabetta in April 2015, is the last SA-15 Super type ship ever built. She was delivered in 1987 and, like her one remaining sister ship, is approaching the end of her economic life.

Despite decades of service in some of the harshest operating conditions on the planet, no SA-15 type freighters have been lost. However, even the newest ships are nearly 40 years old and approaching the end of their economic life. The increasing operating costs of the old vessels with relatively large crews will eventually force the shipping companies currently operating old SA-15 type ships in their fleet to retire them and look for replacements especially for the more demanding arctic routes. Most SA-15 type freighters were transferred to southern routes for their final years and became a common sight especially in Chinese ports.

In 2006–2011 MMC Norilsk Nickel built a series of five 14,500 DWT double acting container ships to replace the ageing fleet of MSCO-owned SA-15 type ships used to support the Norilsk-Dudinka operation. In November 2010 one of these new vessels capable of breaking ice up to 1.7 metres (5.6 ft) thick when operating astern, Monchegorsk, became the first ship to traverse the eastern part of Northern Sea Route without icebreaker assistance while sailing from Murmansk via Dudinka to Shanghai.

The first SA-15 type ship to be scrapped, Kandalaksha, was sold for demolition in China in the spring of 2009. It was followed by the four ships operated by Bank Line – Boularibank was sold for recycling in India and Gazellebank, Tikeibank and Mahinabank in Bangladesh during the second half of 2009 – and Monchegorsk, which arrived at the breakers in China in late 2009. In 2010, they were joined by Kola and Norilsk, which were recycled in India and Huangpu, China, respectively. The first vessels of this type to be scrapped in 2011 were Arkhangelsk, withdrawn from the register on 17 May, and Emerald Sea, reported to be bound for breakers in Alang in late May. They were followed by Captain Kurbatskiy and Amderma, both of which were sold to Indian breakers in late 2011. The last ships of the original SA-15 series were scrapped in 2012 – Professor Barabanov was sold for recycling in Alang in February and Igarka in China in June. 2012 also saw the decommissioning of the first SA-15 Super type ships when Kapitan Man sailed to the breakers in May and Anatoliy Kolesnichenko in July, both ending their life in Chittagong. The only SA-15 type ship to be broken up in 2013, Vasiliy Burkhanov, arrived to the same final destination on 18 December 2013. No SA-15 type ships have been scrapped since and two SA-15 Super type ships, Kapitan Danilkin and Yuriy Arshenevskiy, remain in service as of 2025.

As part of the Yamal LNG project, one of the alternatives that were studied for transporting LNG plant modules to the material offloading facility located in the port of Sabetta was a conversion of one of the remaining SA-15 type ships into a heavy-lift module carrier. If done, it would consist of removing all cargo handling gear ahead of the superstructure and cutting the hull down to the tweendeck in order to create a large level cargo deck for the oversized industrial modules.

== Design ==
=== General characteristics ===
The SA-15 type multipurpose cargo ships have a maximum overall length of 177.20 metres (581 ft 4 in) or 173.55 metres (569 ft 5 in) with the stern notch excluded. Their hulls are 164.10 metres (538 ft 5 in) long at the waterline and their length between perpendiculars is 159.60 metres (523 ft 7 in). The breadth of the ships, like all other cargo ships operating in the Northern Sea Route, is limited to 24.50 metres (80 ft 5 in) by the size of the escorting icebreakers. The shallow waters of the Northern Sea Route limit the draught to 9 metres (29 ft 6 in), but outside the arctic their cargo capacity can be increased by allowing the ice-strengthened parts of the hull to become submerged. Increasing the draught to 11.35 metres (37 ft 3 in) increases their displacement from 27,660 tons to 31,000 tons and deadweight tonnage from 16,600 to around 23,000 tons. While there are minor differences in tonnage and displacement between ships and the actual figures differ slightly from the design values which were measured in register tons, the gross tonnage (GT) of the SA-15 type cargo ships is generally around 18,600 and net tonnage (NT) at summer load waterline ranges from around 8,700 to roughly 9,000, being smaller for the newer SA-15 Super type ships. At the arctic subdivision line the net tonnage is reduced to 6,300.

The SA-15 type freighters have a design speed of 17 knots at the design draught of 8.50 metres (27 ft 11 in) and 90% MCR (13,860 kW), but are capable of reaching speeds up to 18.1 knots. However, the actual service speed of the ships when fully laden is slightly lower, 12 knots with one or 15 knots with both main engines. The fuel capacity, 3,740 m^{3} of heavy fuel oil and 783 m^{3} of diesel oil, gives them an operational range of 16,000 nautical miles in open water. The ships can carry enough provisions for 60 days of operation.

The ships provide accommodation for 52 people, including five double cabins for passengers, and extensive facilities such as library, photographic laboratory, film projector room, swimming pool, sports room, two combined messes and dayrooms, hospital and separate saloons for passengers and the captain. The accommodation spaces have an effective thermal insulation, heating and air conditioning to maintain comfortable inside temperature while the outside temperature varies from −50 °C (−58 °F) to +35 °C (95 °F). The SA-15 type ships also have several special features not commonly found in cargo ships, such as a lookout post in the bow for surveying the ice conditions in front of the ship.

In addition to the official names, the SA-15 type ships are sometimes called "carrots" (Russian: Морковь) because of the shape and orange colour of their hulls.

=== Special features ===
The harsh operating conditions of the arctic seas place high requirements on the strength, reliability and redundancy of the hull and propulsion machinery, especially for single-screw ships operating independently without icebreaker escort. For this reason the hull form of the SA-15 type freighters resembles that of icebreakers and their robust propulsion system has several innovative features and prototype arrangements to improve the ships' operational capability. Special attention has also been paid on the ships' general purpose characteristics by designing the cargo storage and handling facilities to allow various different types of cargo.

==== Hull ====
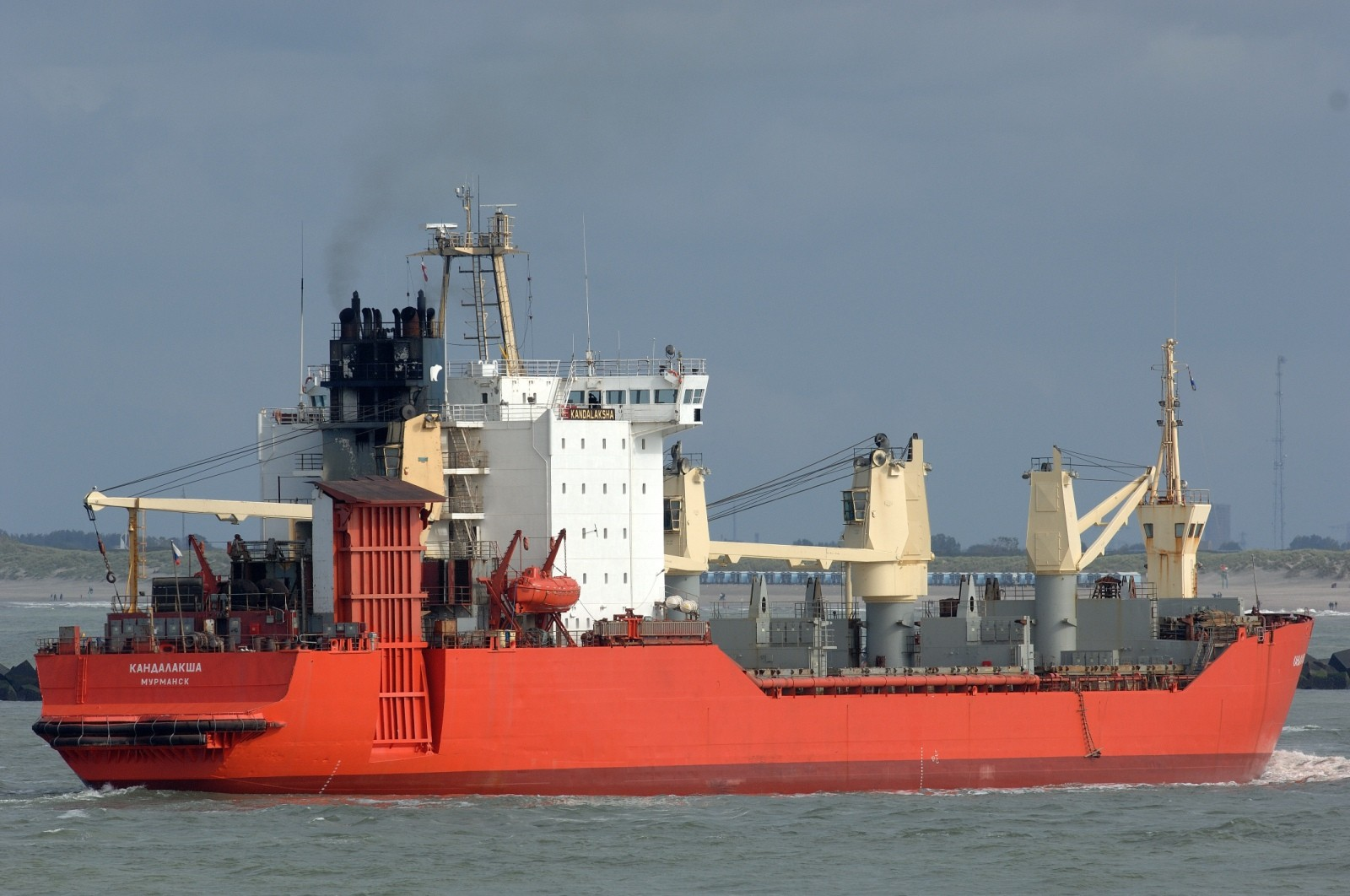
The stern notch of the SA-15 type ships, such as the Kandalaksha, allows safe assistance from icebreakers in particularly difficult ice conditions.

The hull form of the SA-15 type ships, a result of intensive model tests in both open water and model ice, is very different from that of conventional merchant vessels, being more akin to polar icebreakers than traditional cargo ships. The bow design puts equal emphasis on both icebreaking and seakeeping characteristics, meaning that in addition to good icebreaking and manoeuvring capabilities in various ice conditions the vessel must be able to operate in open water without bottom slamming or shipping of green water occurring in rough seas. The sides are flared to prevent the ship from stopping or being damaged when operating in compressive ice fields. The aft part of the hull, while a compromise between good reversing qualities in the ice and low level of propeller-induced vibrations in the stern, is also designed to prevent pieces of ice from coming in contact with the propeller. The ships are also equipped with stern notches similar to those found in icebreakers, but instead of towing other ships they are meant to be used to allow safe assistance from icebreakers in particularly difficult ice conditions.

The material used in the hull is largely grade E shipbuilding steel which is suitable for cold temperatures down to −50 °C (−58 °F). A special high-strength steel, Rautaruukki Raex E32 Polar, is used in the main components of the ice zone where it was protected by abrasion-resistant low-friction paint, Inerta 160. The thickness of the plating in the ice belt is 36 millimetres (1.4 in). Longitudinal framing is used except in the side area between double bottom and tweendeck, which has transverse framing to improve the distribution of ice loads on the side shell.

==== Propulsion and power ====
Propulsion power is provided by two 14-cylinder Wärtsilä-Sulzer 14ZV40/48 4-stroke medium-speed diesel engines running on heavy fuel oil, each with a maximum continuous output of 7,700 kW (10,326 hp) at 560 rpm. As a precaution against failure of the propeller pitch control mechanism the main engines are directly reversible. The fuel consumption while underway is 76 tons per day, but to save fuel costs only one main engine is used when operating in open water.

The main engines are connected to a single propeller shaft through a double input/single output single-stage reduction gear manufactured in Finland by Valmet Rautpohja Works in co-operation with Renk AG. The gearbox is equipped with separate Renk multi disc clutches and Voith fluid couplings for the main engines. The hydrodynamic couplings that allow over 100% slipping between input and output shafts are used in difficult ice conditions to increase propeller torque and protect the main engines from large torque variations resulting from propeller blades hitting the ice. The gearbox itself is also designed to withstand the high thrust and torque loads caused by an open propeller operating in ice – the gear teeth are dimensioned to withstand loads up to five times the nominal value. The fully locking mechanical clutches are used to improve fuel efficiency when the ship is operating in open water or light ice conditions.

The 13-metre (42.7 ft) propeller shaft weighs 66 tons and has a large external diameter, 1,055 mm (41.54 in) in the stern part. The shaft line is designed according to a certain hierarchy of strength, meaning that if the maximum load is exceeded, yielding occurs in predefined points before components that are more expensive or difficult to repair are damaged. Because the propeller pitch control unit is located at the end of the propeller shaft on the other side of the gearbox, no cutouts that would reduce the strength of the shaft are needed.

Because the power output per shaft of the SA-15 type freighters was at that time one of the highest among icebreaking ships, second only to Arktika-class nuclear icebreakers, their propellers are of extremely robust design. The 5.6-metre (18.4 ft), 68-ton, four-bladed stainless steel controllable pitch propellers were developed and manufactured by KaMeWa specially for the SA-15 project. The propeller hubs, which house the pitch adjusting mechanism dimensioned for arctic ice conditions, have a diameter of 2.35 metres (7.7 ft) and were, at the time of the building, the largest ever constructed.

Instead of bow thrusters the ships are equipped with Wärtsilä Air Bubbling System (WABS). Pressurized air released from nozzles located below the waterline lubricates the hull and, by reducing friction between steel and ice, improves the ship's ability to operate in difficult ice conditions such as pressure ridges and reduces the risk of becoming stuck in ice. The system can also be used to steer the ship at low speeds.

For electricity production the ships have four auxiliary generating sets, Wärtsilä-Vasa 624TS 4-stroke medium-speed diesel engines driving 1,000 kVa Strömberg alternators. One of the four engines, each with a power output of 810 kW at 750 rpm, can also be coupled to a radial compressor to serve the air bubbling system. A fifth engine of the same type is dedicated to drive a second compressor. Instead of heavy fuel oil the auxiliary generating sets run on marine diesel oil. There's also an emergency diesel generator of Soviet origin that has a power output of 100 kW at 1,500 rpm.

==== Icebreaking capability ====
The SA-15 type freighters are designed to break level ice up to one metre (3.3 ft) in thickness with a snow layer of 0.2 metres (0.7 ft) in continuous motion without icebreaker assistance and operate in all prevailing ice conditions encountered in the arctic regions such as ridges and compressive ice. Designed for year-round operation in the Northern Sea Route, the freighters were intended to operate unescorted during the summer navigation period and, if necessary, with assistance from Arktika-class icebreakers in the more severe ice conditions during winter. The ships are equipped with a stern notch, similar to the towing notches found in icebreakers, to allow safe pushing assistance from an icebreaker.

The ships were the first freighters in ten years to be built to the highest Soviet ice class notation available for merchant ships, ULA. Their hulls, rudders and propulsion systems were dimensioned according to the then-latest ice class rules of the USSR Register of Shipping. When the ships are loaded to a deeper draught, their ice class is reduced to UL which, despite being slightly lower, is still equivalent to the highest Finnish-Swedish ice class, 1A Super.

==== Cargo handling ====
The SA-15 type freighters are capable of carrying a wide variety of cargo ranging from general and dry bulk cargoes to containers and trailers. Heavy cargo up to 80 tonnes and long goods up to 25 metres (82.0 ft) can also be carried. The ships, designed to serve the remote arctic regions, are also equipped with flexible cargo handling equipment for loading and unloading in undeveloped ports. The cargo gear is designed to operate normally at an ambient temperature of −40 °C (−40 °F) and maintain operational condition at temperatures as low as −50 °C (−58 °F). It is also extensively winterized by arranging most of the operating equipment inside the cargo access units.

The ships have five holds fitted with tweendecks, four forwards and one abaft of the superstructure, with a total grain capacity of 31,181 cubic metres. The foremost hold, No. 1, is specially designed for the carriage of explosives for the mining industry, inflammable liquids and chemicals in packages, and for this reason has a separate seawater fire extinguishing system that can also be used to cool the bulkhead between the foremost holds. Lower holds No. 2, 3 and 4 are designed for bulk cargoes such as coal, ore and grain. Containers can be carried in all holds and on the hatch covers, and the total container capacity of the SA-15 type ships is 576 twenty-foot equivalent units, forty of which can be refrigerated, or 236 forty-foot equivalent units. In addition the ships can carry special ten-foot ore concentrate containers in holds No. 2, 3 and 4, with two layers on tank top and one on tweendeck.

For loading and unloading of general cargo, containers and bulk cargo the ships are geared with four deck cranes located on the centerline, one on the aft deck and three forwards of the superstructure. The No. 2 crane on the foredeck is a twin type crane with a lifting capacity of 2 × 40 tonnes at 20 metres (65.6 ft) while the others are single hydraulic cranes, capable of lifting 20 tonnes, with a maximum outreach of 22 metres (72.2 ft).

The ships can carry roll-on/roll-off cargo on the continuous tweendeck between holds No. 2 and No. 5. The cargo space, which has a capacity of 570 lane metres with a width of 3.0 metres and free height of 4.3 metres, is divided into five watertight compartments with sliding bulkhead doors located between the holds to meet the subdivision requirements. Wheeled cargo can be loaded and unloaded via a 41-tonne stern quarter ramp angled at 65 degrees to the centerline. The 18-metre (59.1 ft) ramp has a free driving width of 5 metres (16.4 ft) and can handle cargo weighing up to 56 tonnes. It can also be lowered directly on ice if the thickness exceeds one metre although the resulting slope angle of 17 degrees would be too much for normal vehicles.

While not designed to carry liquid cargo, the ships have a provision to transfer fuel from either side of the ship to another vessel moored alongside.

A novel cargo handling feature of the SA-15 type freighters was an air cushion platform which could be carried on the weather deck and used to transport cargo ashore or directly to a warehouse in locations having little or no cargo handling facilities. These hovercraft, manufactured by Wärtsilä, were powered by a 625 kW stern-mounted diesel engine driving two fans giving the platform a hovering height of 0.6–0.7 m (2.0–2.3 ft). They were capable of carrying a payload of 38 tonnes over ice, water, land and marshy terrain when towed by a tractor or a tug or, if necessary, by using an auxiliary propulsion unit that gave the platform a speed of at least two knots. However, the air cushion platforms were rarely used and have not been seen on board the SA-15 type freighters since the 1980s.

=== SA-15 Super ===
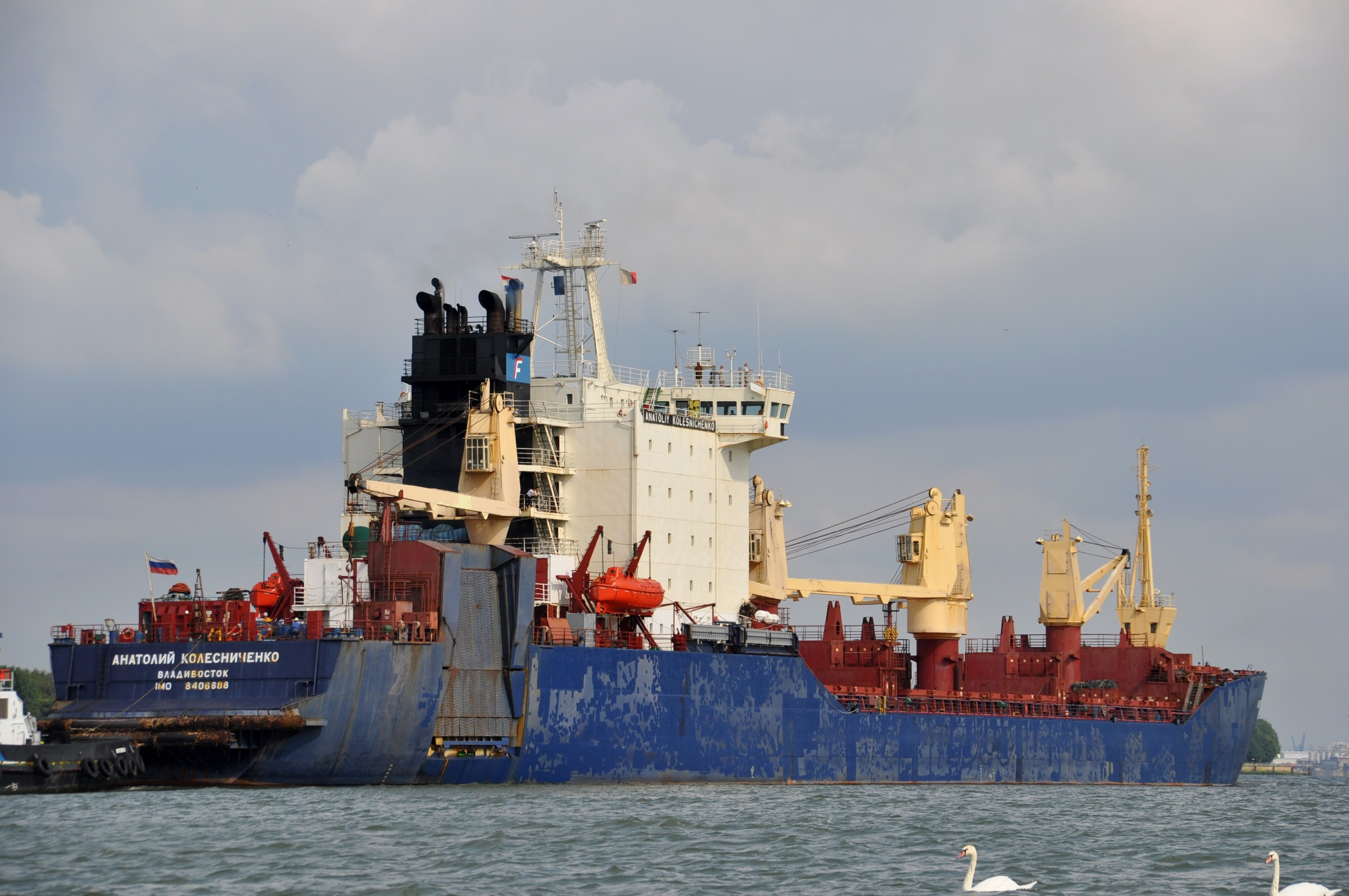
Anatoliy Kolesnichenko and the other SA-15 Super type ships have a folding stern quarter ramp and several other modifications to the original design.

When Valmet Oy received a follow-up order for five SA-15 type cargo ships in 1984, some modifications to the ship were made based on the owner's experiences during the past winter that had been exceptionally hard. While the basic design followed that of the other vessels and the general characteristics remained largely the same, due to the changes the last five ships are sometimes referred to as a separate subclass, SA-15 Super.

The majority of the changes were internal. While the module-based design of the engine room, pioneered by the SA-15 type ships, reduced the amount of working hours while building the ship, the piping was completely redesigned to reduce its overall length and make basic maintenance easier. The fifth auxiliary engine was also left out as it was rarely used in actual operation. Winterization was improved by installing heating elements in the double bottom tanks, improving the heating in other ballast water tanks and increasing ice strengthening in some parts of the hull.

Some modifications were made to cargo spaces and cargo handling equipment. The aftmost lower hold was turned into a refrigerated cargo space and a dividing bulkhead was removed from the foremost hold. The tweendeck hatch covers were changed from wire-operated to hydraulic and, due to the rearranging of the aft deck winches and to ease the handling of mooring lines, the aft hatch was made slightly smaller than in the original ships. The capacity of the deck crane in front of the superstructure was increased to 40 tons to allow better handling of ore containers. The stern quarter ramp was also changed to a folding type that would maintain constant pressure on the quay. There were also some changes to the general arrangements of the lowest accommodation deck.

Externally one of the most noticeable changes in addition to the stern ramp was lowering the lookout post in the bow to improve visibility from the bridge.

=== Bank Line conversion ===
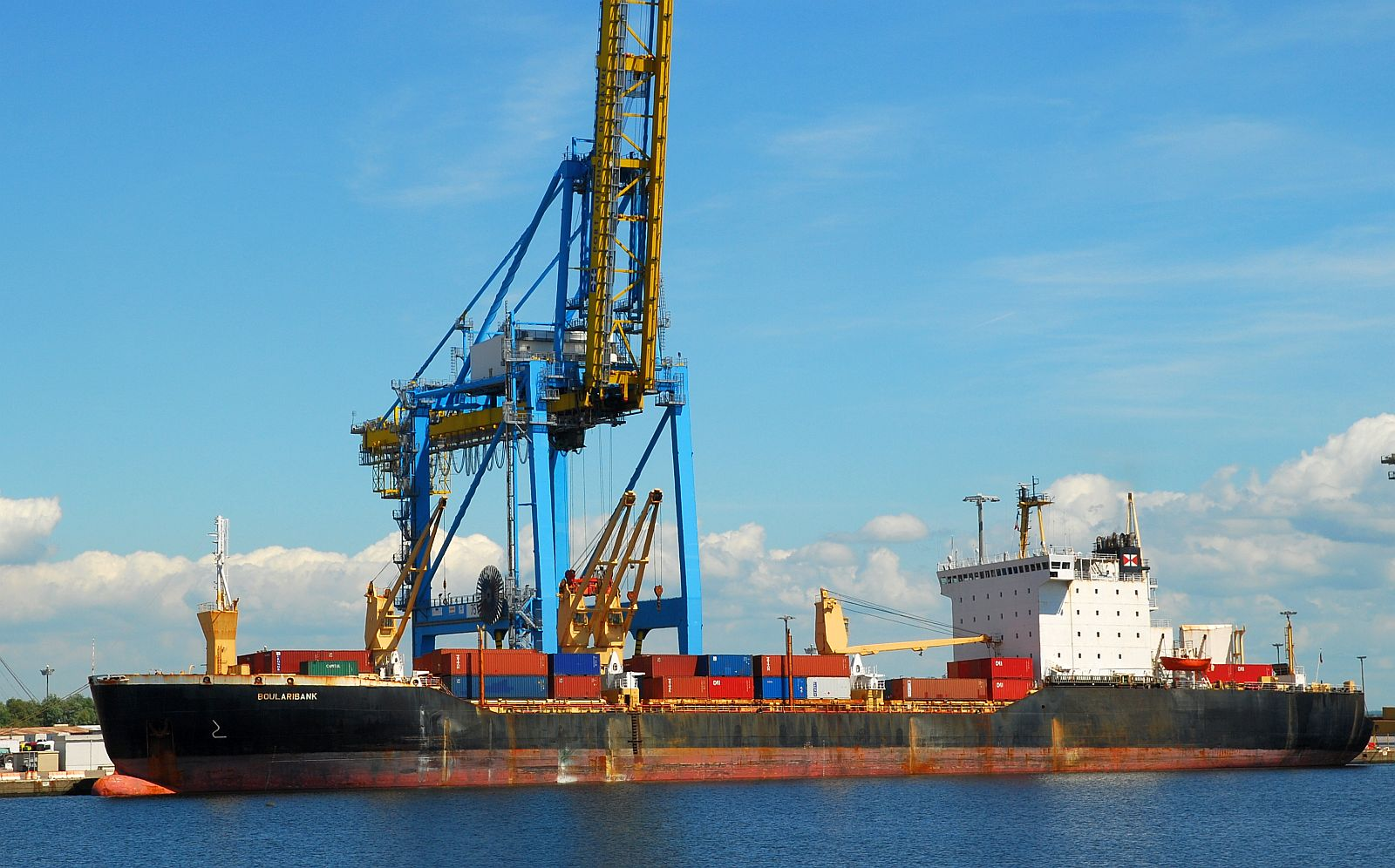
Boularibank (ex-Nikel) had a bulbous bow retrofitted to its icebreaker bow to reduce fuel consumption.

The SA-15 type ships purchased by Andrew Weir Shipping were converted at Cammell Laird and Tyne Tees Dockyard for South Pacific service in 1995 by increasing their cargo-carrying capacity and removing specialized icebreaking features in favor of reduced operating costs.

The conversion consisted of retrofitting a bulbous bow, faired to the existing icebreaker bow, to reduce the wave resistance and replacing the ice-strengthened propeller blades with more efficient highly skewed blades, designed by KaMeWa, to improve speed and fuel consumption. Six double-bottom tanks were converted from bunker to ballast water tanks while nine wing tanks were converted from ballast to heavy fuel oil and two to dedicated heeling tanks. The cargo-carrying capacity of the ships was increased by converting deep tanks between the cargo holds and below the lower deck in the bow for the carriage of vegetable oils. Their maximum allowable draught was increased to 11.3 metres (37.07 ft), which substantially increased the ships' deadweight tonnage. Other changes included upgrading the cargo handling and lifesaving equipment, converting ten cabins for passengers and installing a new incinerator to deal with the shipboard waste. The stern notch was also no longer needed and thus removed, but the Wärtsilä Air Bubbling system was retained for maneuvering.

When China Navigation Co Ltd bought the South Pacific service from Andrew Weir Shipping in 2006, the four SA-15 type freighters were time chartered by the new owner and further modified during drydocking in Singapore. During the refit an additional Wärtsilä Auxpac 6L20 generating set, capable of operating on the same grade of heavy fuel oil as the main engines, was installed alongside the existing smaller 624TS diesel generators and some ballast tanks were converted to heavy fuel oil to increase the bunker capacity. Fuel efficiency was further improved by grit blasting the underwater parts to minimize hull roughness and installing wake-equalising ducts and a rudder bulb. The ships' container capacity was also increased to 702 TEU.

== List of SA-15 type ships ==
| Ship name | Namesake | Last owner or operator | Flag | Shipyard | Year | IMO number | Status | Notes |
SA-15
| Norilsk (Норильск) | Norilsk | NB Shipping Ltd (MSCO) | Cyprus | Oy Wärtsilä Ab, Turku (1256) | 1982 | 8013003 | Scrapped in 2010 | |
| Nizhneyansk (Нижнеянск) (1983–1996); Magdalena Oldendorff (1996–2003); Ocean Luck (2003–2010); Captain Kurbatskiy (Капитан Курбацкий) (2010–2011) | Nizhneyansk | Fern Shipping Inc | Russia | Valmet Oy, Helsinki (310) | 1983 | 8013065 | Scrapped in 2011 | |
| Tiksi (Тикси) (1983–1995); Foylebank (1995–2006); Gazellebank (2006–2009) | Tiksi | Andrew Weir Shipping Ltd | Antigua and Barbuda | Oy Wärtsilä Ab, Turku (1257) | 1983 | 8013015 | Scrapped in 2009 | |
| Igarka (Игарка) | Igarka | Far East Shipping Company | Russia | Oy Wärtsilä Ab, Turku (1258) | 1983 | 8013027 | Scrapped in 2012 | |
| Kola (Кола) | Kola | Murmansk Shipping Company | Russia | Oy Wärtsilä Ab, Turku (1259) | 1983 | 8013053 | Scrapped in 2010 | |
| Arkhangelsk (Архангельск) | Arkhangelsk | NB Shipping Ltd (MSCO) | Cyprus | Oy Wärtsilä Ab, Turku (1260) | 1983 | 8013041 | Scrapped in 2011 | |
| Monchegorsk (Мончегорск) | Monchegorsk | NB Shipping Ltd (MSCO) | Cyprus | Oy Wärtsilä Ab, Turku (1261) | 1983 | 8013039 | Scrapped in 2009 | |
| Amderma (Амдерма) | Amderma | Far East Shipping Company | Russia | Oy Wärtsilä Ab, Turku (1265) | 1983 | 8119144 | Scrapped in 2011 | |
| Okha (Оха) (1983–1995); Speybank (1995–2006); Mahinabank (2006–2009) | Okha | Andrew Weir Shipping Ltd | Antigua and Barbuda | Valmet Oy, Helsinki (311) | 1983 | 8013077 | Scrapped in 2009 | |
| Bratsk (Братск) (1983–1995); Arunbank (1995–2006); Tikeibank (2006–2009) | Bratsk | Andrew Weir Shipping Ltd | Antigua and Barbuda | Valmet Oy, Helsinki (312) | 1983 | 8013089 | Scrapped in 2009 | |
| Kemerovo (Кемерово) (1983–2000); Marathon II (2000–2005); Professor Barabanov (Профессор Барабанов) (2005–2012) | Kemerovo | Morley Marine Ltd | Russia | Valmet Oy, Helsinki (316) | 1983 | 8120662 | Scrapped in 2012 | |
| Kandalaksha (Кандалакша) | Kandalaksha | Murmansk Shipping Company | Russia | Oy Wärtsilä Ab, Turku (1266) | 1984 | 8119156 | Scrapped in 2009 | |
| Anadyr (Анадырь) (1984–2000); Emerald Sea (2000–2011) | Anadyr | Eastland Finance Company | Liberia | Valmet Oy, Helsinki (317) | 1984 | 8120674 | Scrapped in 2011 | |
| Nikel (Никель) (1984–1995); Teignbank (1995–2006); Boularibank (2006–2009) | Nikel | Andrew Weir Shipping Ltd | Antigua and Barbuda | Oy Wärtsilä Ab, Turku (1267) | 1984 | 8119168 | Scrapped in 2009 | |
SA-15 Super
| Anatoliy Kolesnichenko (Анатолий Колесниченко) | | Far East Shipping Company | Russia | Valmet Oy, Helsinki (318) | 1985 | 8406688 | Scrapped in 2012 | |
| Kapitan Man (Капитан Ман) | Ivan Man | Far East Shipping Company | Russia | Valmet Oy, Helsinki (319) | 1985 | 8406690 | Scrapped in 2012 | |
| Yuriy Arshenevskiy (Юрий Аршеневский) | | Murmansk Shipping Company | Russia | Valmet Oy, Helsinki (320) | 1986 | 8406705 | In service | |
| Vasiliy Burkhanov (Василий Бурханов) | Vasiliy Burkhanov | Far East Shipping Company | Russia | Valmet Oy, Helsinki (322) | 1986 | 8406717 | Scrapped in 2013 | |
| Kapitan Danilkin (Капитан Данилкин) | | Murmansk Shipping Company | Russia | Wärtsilä Marine, Helsinki (323) | 1987 | 8406729 | In service | |
