= MV Monchegorsk (1983) =

History
- Name: Monchegorsk (Мончегорск)
- Owner: Murmansk Shipping Company (1983–1994); NB Shipping (1994–2009)
- Port of registry: Soviet Union (1983–1991); Russia (1991–1993); Limassol, Cyprus (1993–2009)
- Ordered: July 1980
- Builder: Oy Wärtsilä Ab, Turku, Finland
- Cost: FIM 200 million
- Yard number: 1261
- Launched: 1 June 1983
- In service: 1983–2009
- Identification: IMO number: 8013039; Call sign P3NL5
- Fate: Sold for scrapping in 2009

General characteristics
- Class & type: SA-15 type ro-ro/general cargo ship; Classification: Russian Maritime Register of Shipping
- Tonnage: 18,627 GT; 8,945 NT (summer); 23,024 DWT (summer); 16,600 DWT (arctic)
- Length: LOA 177.20 m (581.36 ft) (max); LOA 173.55 m (569.39 ft) (hull); LWL 164.10 m (538.39 ft); LPP 159.6 m (523.62 ft)
- Beam: 24.55 m (80.54 ft)
- Height: 51.50 m (168.96 ft) from keel
- Draught: 11.34 m (37.20 ft) (summer); 9 m (29.53 ft) (arctic)
- Depth: 15.2 m (49.87 ft)
- Ice class: ULA
- Installed power: Main engines: 2 × Wärtsilä-Sulzer 14ZV40/48 (2 × 7,700 kW); Auxiliary engines: 5 × Wärtsilä-Vasa 624 TS (5 × 810 kW)
- Propulsion: KaMeWa CPP, ⌀ 5.6 m (18.37 ft)
- Capacity: 10 passengers
- Crew: 42

MV Monchegorsk (Мончегорск) was an SA-15 type cargo ship built by Wärtsilä in Turku, Finland, in 1983. Named after a town of the same name, the freighter was the tenth ship of a series of 19 icebreaking multipurpose arctic freighters built by Wärtsilä and Valmet for the Soviet Union for year-round service in the Northern Sea Route. These ships, designed to be capable of independent operation in arctic ice conditions, were of extremely robust design and had strengthened hulls resembling those of polar icebreakers.

Initially delivered to the (then) state-owned Murmansk Shipping Company and later handed over to its subsidiary, NB Shipping, Monchegorsk sailed under the Soviet and later Russian flag until 1993, after which she was registered to Cyprus. She was sold for recycling in China in late 2009 after 26 years of service.

== History ==
=== Development and construction ===
The history of the SA-15 class cargo ships dates back to the late 1970s when the leading Finnish shipbuilders Wärtsilä and Valmet both developed designs that met the requirements set by the Ministry of the Merchant Marine of the Soviet Union (MORFLOT) for the new class of arctic cargo ships capable of year-round operation in the Northern Sea Route. An initial order for nine ships, six for Wärtsilä for FIM 1.2 billion and three for Valmet for FIM 600 million, was placed in July 1980. In the following year three more ships were ordered from Wärtsilä and two from Valmet, resulting in a total order of 14 ships worth of FIM 3.5 billion. While initially the idea of ordering two similar but technically different series of ships for the same purpose was to gain operational experience for the future arctic freighters, shortly after the deal was made public the shipyards approached Sudoimport to agree on a uniform design, resulting in a class of sub-arctic 15,000 DWT cargo ships, the SA-15 class. After the initial series Valmet received another follow-up order for five ships of slightly different design, sometimes referred to as the SA-15 Super class due to the minor improvements based on the operators' experiences in the arctic.

=== Career ===
Monchegorsk was delivered by Wärtsilä in 1983 as the tenth ship of the series. While the ship belonged to the Murmansk Shipping Company (MSCO), a state-owned shipping company that operated mainly in the western parts of the Soviet arctic, she was sent to the east shortly after delivery due to the particularly difficult ice conditions of the winter of 1983. After years of service in the arctic the ownership and management of Monchegorsk was handed over to NB Shipping, a subsidiary of MSCO that operated a number of SA-15 class freighters, and moved to ice-free waters.

On 9 February 2006 Monchegorsk collided with the Brunsbüttel locks in the Kiel Canal. The accident, caused by strong wind, happened when the locks, closed because of the very high tide, were reopened. No major damage to either the ship or the locks was reported.

=== Evangelos Florakis Naval Base explosion ===
In early 2009, Monchegorsk became the centre of an international incident involving Iran, Russia, the US, Israel, the Palestinian territories and Cyprus. The ship was apprehended in the Red Sea by U.S. warships in Task Force 151 having left Iran. Following an onboard search suspicious military material was reported and the ship was escorted to Limassol Port on 29 January 2009.

The ship, registered with the Cyprus Merchant Marine was then subject to an international diplomacy struggle as to the fate of its cargo. The US and Israel maintained that the cargo was in violation of United Nations Security Council Resolution 1747 which sanctions Iranian arms exports. Israel claimed that the intended destination of the cargo was Palestinian organizations in the Gaza strip, a claim that Iran denied.

Cypriot authorities proceeded to a search of onboard containers, the result of which was referred to the security council for clarification. Once the breach was confirmed the cargo was confiscated and unloaded onto the island where it was stored in warehouses of the Cypriot National Guard. The inspection revealed containers carrying 120 mm, 122 mm, 125 mm, and 160 mm high explosives that originated in Iran and were destined for Syria. Inspection also revealed 7.62 mm shell casings, compressed gunpowder, silver dollar-sized slugs, primer, and magnesium primers.

More than two years later, on 11 July 2011, those same containers, stored in the open under clearly inappropriate conditions at the Evangelos Florakis Navy Base near Mari, Cyprus, exploded, leaving 13 people dead and 61 injured. The explosion created a 600-metre wide crater and caused the almost total destruction of the naval base and very severe damages to the nearby power station of Vasilikos. As a result of the damages sustained by the explosion, the Vasilikos power station, which accounted for more than half of all power production in Cyprus was disabled, causing a severe power shortage and rotating power cuts throughout the island. Since Cyprus gets much of its water from desalination plants, the power shortage also led to water shortage.

=== Decommissioning ===
The ship was sold for recycling in China in late 2009 for US$316 per ton, resulting in a scrap price of US$3.4 million for a ship with a light displacement of 10,816 tons. In 2008 a double acting ship operated by Norilsk Nickel was named Monchegorsk after the SA-15 class freighter that had once supported the Norilsk–Dudinka operation.

== Design ==
The hull form of the ship, a result of intensive model tests in both open water and model ice, was very different from that of conventional merchant vessels, being more akin to polar icebreakers than traditional cargo ships. However, in addition to good icebreaking and manoeuvring capabilities in various ice conditions the vessel had to be able to operate in open water without bottom slamming or shipping of green water occurring in rough seas. Despite the compromises the ship had impressive icebreaking capability — the SA-15 class ships were designed to break level ice up to one metre (3.3 ft) in thickness with a snow layer of 0.2 metres (0.7 ft) in continuous motion without icebreaker assistance. These ships were also the first freighters in ten years to be built to the highest Soviet ice class notation available for merchant ships, ULA.

The ship had a maximum overall length of 177.20 metres (581.36 ft) or 173.55 metres (569.39 ft) with the stern notch excluded. The breadth of the ship, like all other cargo ships operating in the Northern Sea Route, was limited to 24.50 metres (80.38 ft) by the size of the escorting icebreakers. The shallow waters of the Northern Sea Route limited the draught to 9 metres (29.53 ft), but outside the arctic the cargo capacity of the ship could be increased by allowing the ice-strengthened parts of the hull to become submerged.

The harsh operating conditions of the arctic seas place high requirements on the strength, reliability and redundancy of the propulsion machinery, especially for single-screw ships operating independently without icebreaker escort. For this reason the robust propulsion system had several innovative features and prototype arrangements to improve the ship's operational capability. Propulsion power was provided by two 14-cylinder Wärtsilä-Sulzer 14ZV40/48 4-stroke medium-speed diesel engines running on heavy fuel oil, each with a maximum continuous output of 7,700 kW (10,326 hp) at 560 rpm. As a precaution against failure of the propeller pitch control mechanism the main engines were directly reversible. The main engines were connected to a single propeller shaft through a double input/single output single-stage reduction gear equipped with separate multi disc clutches and Voith fluid couplings. The hydrodynamic couplings that allow over 100% slipping between input and output shafts were used in difficult ice conditions to increase propeller torque and protect the main engines from large torque variations resulting from propeller blades hitting the ice. The fully locking mechanical clutches were used to improve fuel efficiency when the ship is operating in open water or light ice conditions. Because the power output per shaft of the SA-15 class freighters was at that time one of the highest among icebreaking ships, second only to the Arktika class nuclear icebreakers, the propeller of the ship was of extremely robust design. The four-bladed stainless steel controllable-pitch propeller was developed and manufactured by KaMeWa specially for the SA-15 project.

Being a multipurpose general cargo ship, the vessel was capable of carrying a wide variety of cargo ranging from general and dry bulk cargoes to containers, heavy cargo, long goods and trailers. The ship had five holds fitted with tweendecks, four forwards and one abaft of the superstructure. The ship, designed to serve the remote arctic regions, was also equipped with flexible winterized cargo handling equipment for loading and unloading in undeveloped ports. For loading and unloading of general cargo, containers and bulk cargo the ship was geared with four deck cranes located on the centerline, one on the aft deck and three forwards of the superstructure. On the continuous tweendeck the ship could also carry roll-on/roll-off cargo which was loaded and unloaded via a stern quarter ramp that could also be lowered directly on ice.
