= MV Captain Kurbatskiy =

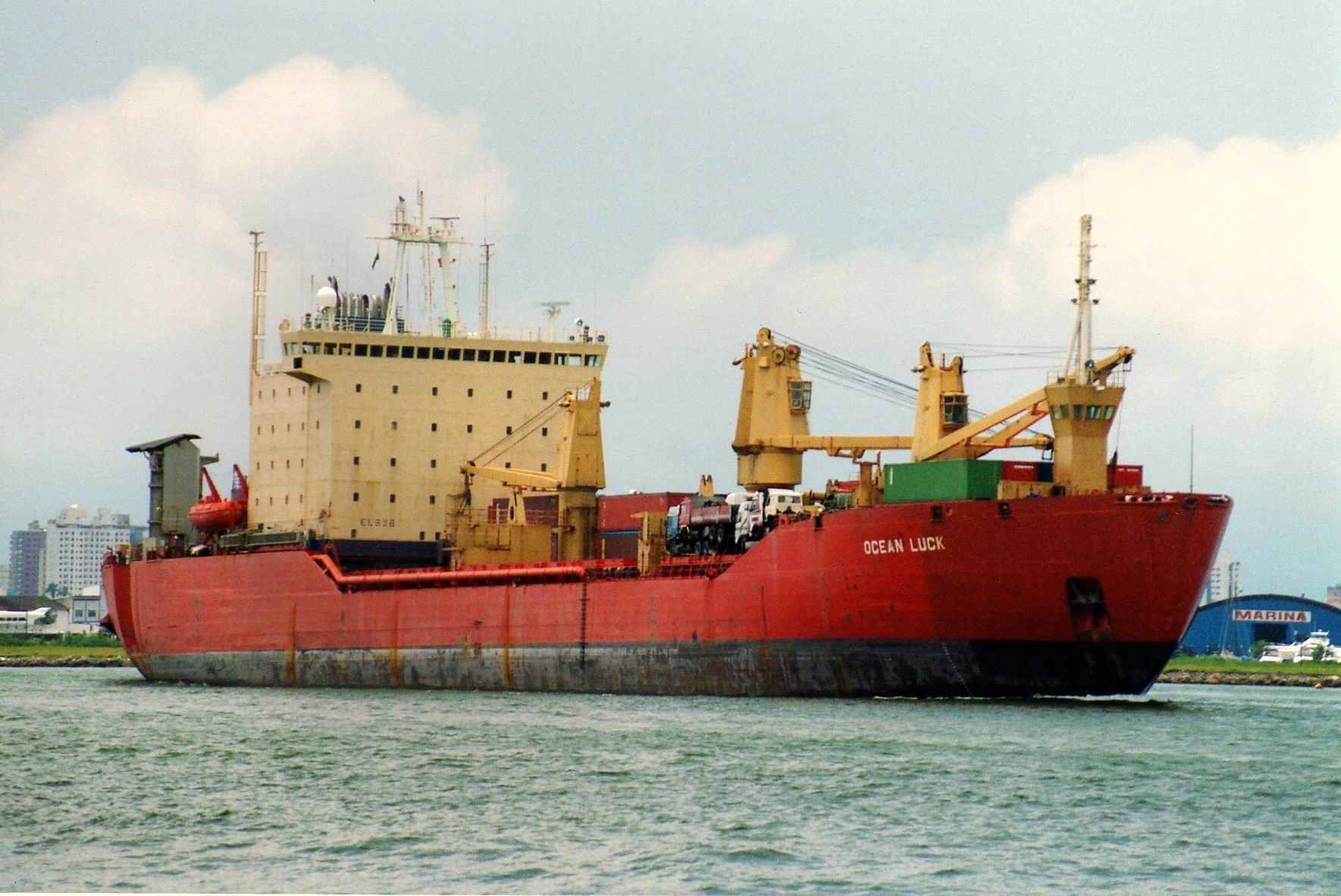
- Ocean Luck in the Port of Santos in São Paulo, Brazil on 24 January 2005.

History
- Name: Nizhneyansk (Нижнеянск) (1983–1996); Magdalena Oldendorff (1996–2003); Ocean Luck (2003–2010); Captain Kurbatskiy (Капитан Курбацкий) (2010–2011)
- Owner: Far East Shipping Company (1983–1996); Bandwidth Shipping Corporation (1996–2003); Crystal Waters Shipping (2003–2010); Fern Shipping (2010–2011)
- Port of registry: Vladivostok, Soviet Union (1983–1991); Vladivostok, Russia (1991–1996); Monrovia, Liberia (1996–2010); Cambodia (2010); Vanino, Russia (2010–2011)
- Ordered: July 1980
- Builder: Valmet Oy Vuosaari shipyard, Helsinki, Finland
- Cost: FIM 200 million
- Yard number: 310
- Launched: 29 June 1982
- Christened: 11 December 1982
- Completed: 21 January 1983
- In service: 1983–2011
- Identification: Call sign: UBTG8; IMO number: 8013065
- Fate: Broken up in November 2011

General characteristics
- Class & type: SA-15 type ro-ro/general cargo ship
- Tonnage: 18,627 GT; 8,945 NT (summer); 23,024 DWT (summer); 16,600 DWT (arctic)
- Displacement: 33,840 tons (summer); 27,660 tons (arctic)
- Length: 177.20 m (581 ft 4 in) (overall, maximum); 173.55 m (569 ft 5 in) (overall, hull); 164.10 m (538 ft 5 in) (waterline)
- Beam: 24.55 m (80.54 ft)
- Height: 51.50 m (168.96 ft) from keel
- Draught: 11.34 m (37.20 ft) (summer); 9 m (29.53 ft) (arctic)
- Depth: 15.2 m (49.87 ft)
- Ice class: ULA
- Main engines: 2 × Wärtsilä-Sulzer 14ZV40/48 (2 × 7,700 kW)
- Auxiliary engines: 5 × Wärtsilä-Vasa 624 TS (5 × 810 kW)
- Propulsion: KaMeWa CPP, ⌀ 5.6 m (18.37 ft)
- Speed: 18.1 knots (33.5 km/h; 20.8 mph)
- Accommodation: 42 crew 10 passengers

MV Captain Kurbatskiy (Капитан Курбацкий) was a Russian SA-15 type cargo ship originally known as Nizhneyansk (Нижнеянск) after a port of the same name. The ship was delivered from Valmet Vuosaari shipyard in 1983 as the second ship of a series of 19 icebreaking multipurpose arctic freighters built by Valmet and Wärtsilä, another Finnish shipbuilder, for the Soviet Union for year-round service in the Northern Sea Route. These ships, designed to be capable of independent operation in arctic ice conditions, were of extremely robust design and had strengthened hulls resembling those of polar icebreakers.

In 1996, after 13 years of service under Soviet and later Russian Far East Shipping Company (FESCO), the ship was sold to Bandwidth Shipping Corporation, who renamed it Magdalena Oldendorff and later chartered it as a support ship for the 20th Indian Antarctic Expedition. In 2003 the ship changed hands again and the new owner, Crystal Waters Shipping, renamed it Ocean Luck. Since 2010 the ship sailed as Captain Kurbatskiy under the ownership of Fern Shipping. Decommissioned and sold for scrapping in Alang, India, in 2011, Captain Kurbatskiy arrived at the breakers on 12 November 2011.

== History ==
=== Development and construction ===
The history of the SA-15 class cargo ships dates back to the late 1970s when the leading Finnish shipbuilders Wärtsilä and Valmet both developed designs that met the requirements set by the Ministry of the Merchant Marine of the Soviet Union (MORFLOT) for the new class of arctic cargo ships capable of year-round operation in the Northern Sea Route. An initial order for nine ships, six for Wärtsilä for FIM 1.2 billion and three for Valmet for FIM 600 million, was placed in July 1980. In the following year three more ships were ordered from Wärtsilä and two from Valmet, resulting in a total order of 14 ships worth of FIM 3.5 billion. While initially the idea of ordering two similar but technically different series of ships for the same purpose was to gain operational experience for the future arctic freighters, shortly after the deal was made public the shipyards approached Sudoimport to agree on a uniform design, resulting in a class of sub-arctic 15,000 DWT cargo ships, the SA-15 class. After the initial series Valmet received another follow-up order for five ships of slightly different design, sometimes referred to as the SA-15 Super class due to the minor improvements based on the operators' experiences in the arctic.

=== Career ===
==== Nizhneyansk (1983–1996) ====
The first SA-15 class ship from Valmet, Nizhneyansk, was delivered from the Vuosaari shipyard in Helsinki on 21 January 1983, about three months ahead of the contracted delivery time.

As the winter of 1983 was particularly difficult, Nizhneyansk was sent to the Northern Sea Route to unload cargo from icebound ships and deliver the much-needed supplies to isolated communities along the coast. Superior to older freighters, the new SA-15 class ships also acted as escort icebreakers, using their stern notches to tow smaller ships through the ice fields even though it was not their original purpose. The strength of the new ships was further proven when icebreaker Admiral Makarov, after having been immobilized for five days, pushed the freshly delivered Nizhneyansk at full power through the ice separating the vessels from Pevek, arriving at the city as the first ships of the year 1983.

==== Magdalena Oldendorff (1996–2003) ====
In 1996 Nizhneyansk was sold to a Liberian company Bandwidth Shipping Corporation, reclassified by Germanischer Lloyd and renamed Magdalena Oldendorff. Operated by a German shipping company Oldendorff Carriers, a subsidiary of Egon Oldendorff, the ship was chartered in 2000 as a support ship for the 20th Indian Antarctic Expedition. On 11 June 2002 Magdalena Oldendorff, while on her second voyage to the Maitri Base, was immobilized by pack ice. 79 Russian scientists and 11 crew members were airlifted by helicopters to the South African research ship S. A. Agulhas and returned to Cape Town. After an unsuccessful rescue attempt by the Argentine icebreaker Almirante Irízar in late August a decision was made for the ship to winter in the Bay of Muskegbukta and attempt to free itself when the ice started to melt with the beginning of the Antarctic summer. In late November Magdalena Oldendorff freed itself and returned to Cape Town in time for Christmas.

==== Ocean Luck (2003–2010) and Captain Kurbatskiy (2010–2011) ====
The ship changed owners again in 2003 when it was purchased by Crystal Waters Shipping and renamed Ocean Luck. The ship, managed by a Ukrainian shipping company Kaalbye Shipping Ukraine KSU, retained its Liberian registry.

In 2010 the ship was purchased by its last owner, Fern Shipping, and renamed Captain Kurbatskiy. After spending a brief period of time under Cambodian flag the ship was again registered to Russia and classified by the Russian Maritime Register of Shipping. On 21 June 2011, after having been anchored off Muara Asam Asam in Kalimantan, Indonesia, for almost two months due to a commercial dispute on a quality of loaded nickel ore, seven crew members managed to purchase three litres of pure spirits from a ship chandler to have a party. Unbeknownst to them, the captain of the ship had asked the ship chandler to deliver ethanol for the ship's medical kit, but had rejected the suspicious-looking bottles because they had no prints proving that the content was suitable for medical use. Instead of 90–95% ethanol spirit the liquid in the bottles contained 36% of methanol, and four of the seven crew members involved in the party died as a result of methanol poisoning.

Captain Kurbatskiy was offered for sale in August 2011 for US$7 million, which was slightly higher than the current demolition prices for such vessel in India. However, in late 2011 it was reported that the vessel had been sold for breaking in Alang, India. The scrappers paid US$515 per ton for the vessel with a light displacement of 10,738 tons, resulting in a total price of roughly US$5.5 million. The ship arrived at Alang on 12 November 2011.

== Design ==
The hull form of the ship, a result of intensive model tests in both open water and model ice, was very different from that of conventional merchant vessels, being more akin to polar icebreakers than traditional cargo ships. However, in addition to good icebreaking and manoeuvring capabilities in various ice conditions the vessel had to be able to operate in open water without bottom slamming or shipping of green water occurring in rough seas. Despite the compromises the ship had impressive icebreaking capability — the SA-15 class ships were designed to break level ice up to one metre (3.3 ft) in thickness with a snow layer of 0.2 metres (0.7 ft) in continuous motion without icebreaker assistance. The ships were also the first freighters in ten years to be built to the highest Soviet ice class notation available for merchant ships, ULA.

The ship had a maximum overall length of 177.20 metres (581.36 ft) or 173.55 metres (569.39 ft) with the stern notch excluded. The breadth of the ship, like all other cargo ships operating in the Northern Sea Route, was limited to 24.50 metres (80.38 ft) by the size of the escorting icebreakers. The shallow waters of the Northern Sea Route limited the draught to 9 metres (29.53 ft), but outside the arctic the cargo capacity of the ship could be increased by allowing the ice-strengthened parts of the hull to become submerged.

The harsh operating conditions of the arctic seas placed high requirements on the strength, reliability and redundancy of the propulsion machinery, especially for single-screw ships operating independently without icebreaker escort. For this reason the robust propulsion system had several innovative features and prototype arrangements to improve the ship's operational capability. Propulsion power was provided by two 14-cylinder Wärtsilä-Sulzer 14ZV40/48 4-stroke medium-speed diesel engines running on heavy fuel oil, each with a maximum continuous output of 7,700 kW (10,326 hp) at 560 rpm. As a precaution against failure of the propeller pitch control mechanism the main engines were directly reversible. The main engines were connected to a single propeller shaft through a double input/single output single-stage reduction gear equipped with separate multi disc clutches and Voith fluid couplings. The hydrodynamic couplings that allowed over 100% slipping between input and output shafts were used in difficult ice conditions to increase propeller torque and protect the main engines from large torque variations resulting from propeller blades hitting the ice. The fully locking mechanical clutches were used to improve fuel efficiency when the ship was operating in open water or light ice conditions. Because the power output per shaft of the SA-15 class freighters was at that time one of the highest among icebreaking ships, second only to the Arktika class nuclear icebreakers, the propeller of the ship was of extremely robust design. The four-bladed stainless steel controllable-pitch propeller was developed and manufactured by KaMeWa specially for the SA-15 project.

A multipurpose general cargo ship, the vessel was capable of carrying a wide variety of cargo ranging from general and dry bulk cargoes to containers, heavy cargo, long goods and trailers. The ship had five holds fitted with tweendecks, four forwards and one abaft of the superstructure. The ship, designed to serve the remote arctic regions, was also equipped with flexible winterized cargo handling equipment for loading and unloading in undeveloped ports. For loading and unloading of general cargo, containers and bulk cargo the ship was geared with four deck cranes located on the centerline, one on the aft deck and three forwards of the superstructure. On the continuous tweendeck the ship could also carry roll-on/roll-off cargo which was loaded and unloaded via a stern quarter ramp that could also be lowered directly on ice.
