= V14 =

V14 may refer to:

- District Heights–Seat Pleasant Line, of the Washington Metropolitan Area Transit Authority
- Fokker V.14, an experimental aircraft
- V14 engine, a class of engine
- V14, a grade in bouldering
- V14, a personal history of allergy to medicinal agents, in the ICD-9 V codes
