= Igarka (disambiguation) =

Igarka is a town in Krasnoyarsk Krai, Russia.

Igarka may also refer to:

- Igarka Urban Settlement, a municipal formation which the district town of Igarka in Turukhansky District of Krasnoyarsk Krai, Russia is incorporated as
- Igarka Airport (IAA/UOII), an airport in Krasnoyarsk Krai
- MV Igarka, a Finnish cargo ship launched in 1983
