= ZM-87 =

Chinese blinding laser weapon

- Type: Laser weapon
- Place of origin: China

The ZM-87 Portable Laser Disturber (Chinese: ZM-87便携式激光干扰器) is a Chinese electro-optic countermeasure neodymium laser device.

== Design ==
The ZM-87 was primarily intended to blind humans but was also reported to damage the photo-electric elements in laser rangefinders, videocameras and missile seekers. Roughly 22 of the devices were produced by the company Norinco before production ceased in 2000 as a result of the 1995 United Nations Protocol on Blinding Laser Weapons ban.

== Adoption ==
The ZM-87 is notable as one of only a few laser weapons ever produced. Controversy has also surrounded the United States' allegations of possible recent use by Russian, Chinese, and North Korean armed forces.

== Data ==
- Power output: 15 mW , 5 pulses per second, at two wavelengths.
- Maximum range (blinding): 2 to 3 kilometres (1.2 to 1.9 mi) (5 km or 3.1 mi if a 7× magnifying optic is used)
- Maximum range (temporary blinding): 10 km (6.2 mi)
- Weight (without battery): 35 kilograms (77 lb)

A battery supplies a portable electric energy converter which through a cable feeds a beam emitter 84 cm (33 in) long mounted on a tripod. It has a gunsight. It resembles a heavy machine gun. A portable variant was also produced, resembling a QBZ-95 bullpup assault rifle with a telescopic sight attached.

== History ==
Development of the ZM-87 began in the late 1980s. The device was first publicly revealed at a defense exhibition in the Philippines in May 1995 and, soon after, in Abu Dhabi, where the weapon gained publicity. In October 1995, during the United Nations Convention on Certain Conventional Weapons, Protocol IV, banning blinding laser weapons, was passed, making the ZM-87 illegal. In April 1997, a United States Naval officer sustained a retinal injury consistent with exposure to this sort of laser fired from the Russian freighter Kapitan Man at a Canadian Forces helicopter in which he was a passenger. This became known as the Strait of Juan de Fuca laser incident. By December 2000, known production of ZM-87 had ceased. However, in 2003 North Korea was reported to have used the ZM-87 to illuminate two United States Army Apache helicopters.

== See also ==
- ZKZM-500
- Dazzler (weapon)
