= ZKZM-500 =

2018 hoax in China

The ZKZM-500 is the subject of a July 2018 article in the South China Morning Post describing a laser gun purported to have been developed by Chinese researchers of the Xian Institute of Optics and Precision Mechanics at the Chinese Academy of Sciences in Shaanxi. The article described the device in conflicting terms, both as "non-lethal" but also capable of "instant carbonisation of human skin and tissues". SCMP also published a video demonstrating what appeared to be a laser setting fire to various objects at tens of meters distance.

Outside of China, universal doubt was expressed regarding the existence of such a weapon.

== See also ==
- ZM-87, a blinding laser weapon designed by the PRC.
