= Strait of Juan de Fuca laser incident =

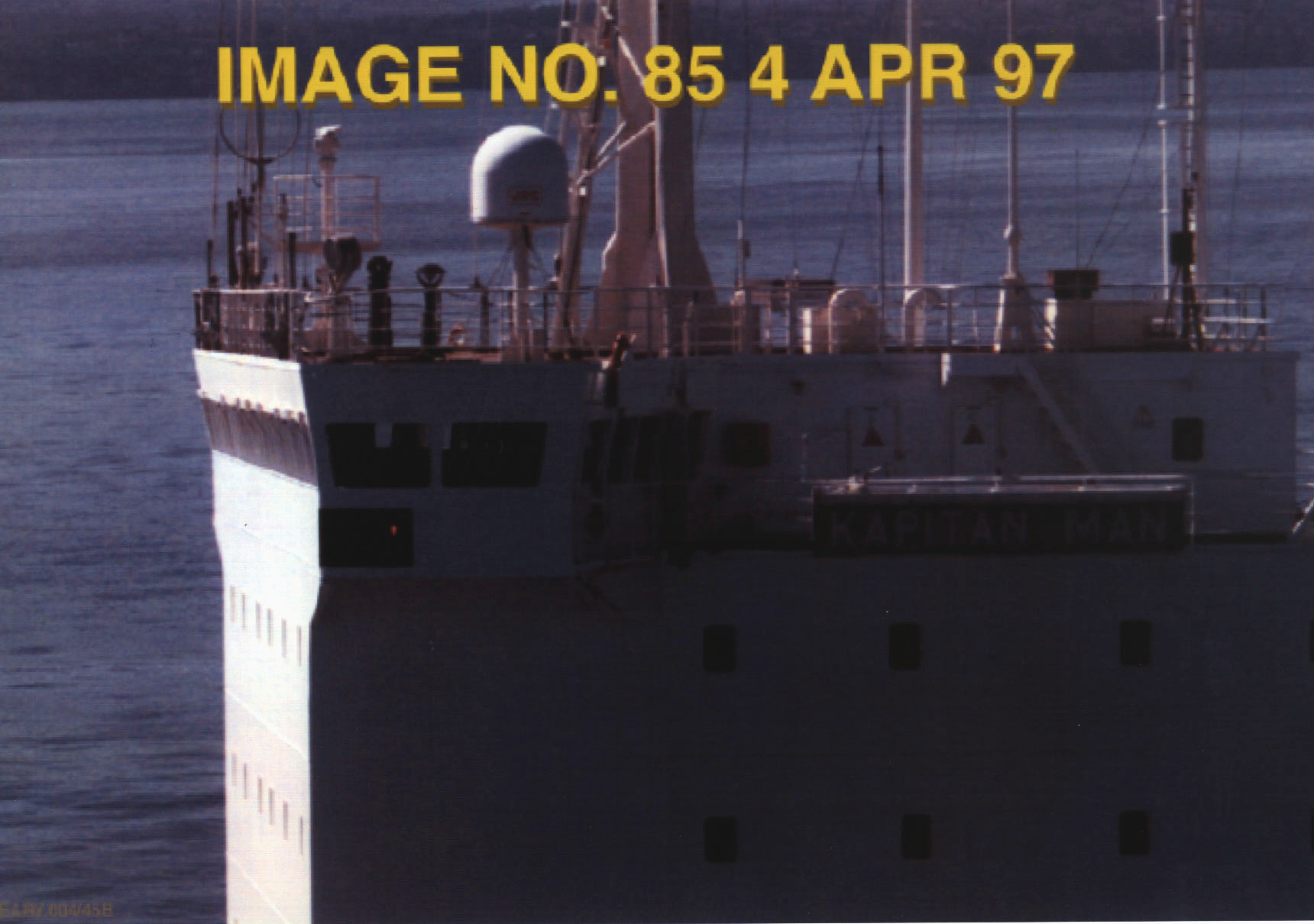
Kapitan Man on 4 April 1997

On 4 April 1997, a Canadian Armed Forces helicopter was allegedly illuminated by a laser while observing the Russian merchant ship and suspected spy vessel Kapitan Man, which was in the Strait of Juan de Fuca in U.S. territorial waters near Port Angeles, Washington. The Canadian Air Force pilot and the U.S. Navy passenger, who was taking photographs of the ship, reported eye pain and claimed injuries consistent with laser exposure. However, subsequent investigations into the incident were unable to verify that any lasing had occurred, and extensive medical examinations found no evidence of laser damage.

== Background ==
Responding to a request based on previous suspicious activity of the Kapitan Man, the Canadian Forces dispatched a CH-124 helicopter to fly by the ship and take photographs of it and its abnormal aerial antenna structure, which was indicative of a ship that could be conducting electronic intelligence or SIGINT activities. The U.S. Coast Guard had previously confiscated submarine surveillance equipment from the ship in 1993. At the time of the incident, the Kapitan Man was 5 nautical miles (9 km; 6 mi) north of Port Angeles, Washington i.e. inside U.S. territorial waters.

On board the aircraft were U.S. Navy Lieutenant Jack Daly and Canadian Forces pilot Captain Patrick Barnes. Lt. Daly was the Navy's foreign-intelligence liaison officer in Esquimalt, British Columbia, heading a joint U.S.-Canadian helicopter-surveillance operation against Russian, Chinese, and other spy ships operating in the Strait of Juan de Fuca, which separates the Canadian province of British Columbia from the U.S. state of Washington, and in Puget Sound, the site of major U.S. nuclear ballistic missile submarine and aircraft carrier bases with the Royal Canadian Navy Pacific Fleet Headquarters in Esquimalt Harbour near Victoria, B.C.

== Reported symptoms ==
While taking photographs of the ship and its bridge, Lt. Daly reported experiencing intense pain in his right eye as well as temporary blindness. An initial retina specialist diagnosed small retinal pigment epithelium (RPE) defects as laser injuries. Daly testified that Capt. Barnes was also affected in a similar manner and was permanently grounded as a result of this incident; he has since lost all his flight qualifications.

In February 1999, Daly testified before the U.S. House Armed Services Committee about his experience. He said that he and Capt. Barnes both had extreme sensitivity to sunlight and light sources. Driving at night became impossible as did watching movies or night ball games: "The only form of even momentary relief that either one of us can rely on is sitting in the dark with our eyes closed, yet lately even that does not seem to help much." In the same time period, he discussed his case on the ABC News program 20/20, saying "I've been in constant pain since the 4th of April '97, without a moment's relief."

== Kapitan Man search ==
Shortly after the incident, U.S. Coast Guard teams were given two hours to search the vessel but did not locate a laser. Teams were not given full access to the ship, however, and the Clinton administration had warned the Russian government in advance the ship would be searched.

== Lawsuit and Purple Heart request ==
In October 2002, Daly sued the Russian Far East Shipping Company (FESCO), owner of the Kapitan Man, in federal court. In his opening statement, Daly's lawyer laid out their side of the case. The company's lawyer countered that there was no positive evidence of a laser on the ship. The jury deliberated for a day and ruled that the laser attack could not be linked to FESCO. Daly's lawyer told the press that the case was hampered by U.S. government resistance and unfavorable rulings by the judge.

In September 2004, the Chief of Naval Operations denied an Inspector General's recommendation that Daly be awarded the Purple Heart (for wounds sustained by opposing forces). Part of the CNO's rejection stated:

In summary, even assuming that the injuries were indeed caused by a laser aimed from the Russian-flagged merchant vessel Kapitan Man, there is no basis to declare that ship a hostile force or the incident a terrorist act.... [W]hile we regret any injuries Lt. Cmdr. Daly sustained while in service to his country, the facts of this case do not support an award of the Purple Heart.

== Clinical assessment ==
The August 2004 issue of the Archives of Ophthalmology analyzed the incident as "Case 5," with authors including Dr. Bruce Stuck of the U.S. Army Medical Research Detachment. Although the report did not identify the individual or the military nature of the event, the description matches the Strait of Juan de Fuca laser incident. The initial retina specialist diagnosed small retinal pigment epithelium (RPE) defects as laser injuries, despite normal optical coherence tomography results and inconsistent visual test findings.

Seventeen subsequent examinations by other ophthalmologists, including neuro-ophthalmologists and retina specialists, found no evidence of laser damage. The authors noted that such RPE defects are common and, even if caused by minimal laser exposure, could not account for the patient's wide-ranging symptoms. They concluded the symptoms were more likely due to pre-existing autoimmune conditions. A lawsuit brought by the photographer against the ship's owner was later dismissed by a jury.

== See also ==
- ZM-87 Portable Laser Disturber
- Lasers and aviation safety
- Lady R incident (2022)
- 2024 Estlink 2 incident (2024)
