= Vuosaari shipyard =

Shipyard in Vuosaari, Helsinki, Finland

Coordinates: 60.21556°N 25.17889°E

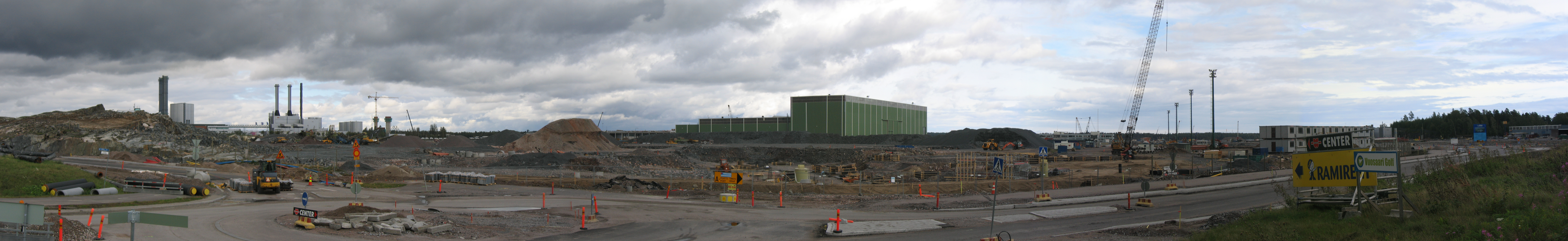
The site of the former Vuosaari shipyard during the construction of the new harbour in 2007. The green buildings in the middle were the old block assembly halls. Part of the dry dock is visible in the right edge of the picture.

Vuosaari shipyard was a shipyard located in the district of Vuosaari in Helsinki, Finland. Built by the Finnish state-owned company Valmet Oy in the early 1970s, the shipyard delivered 33 newbuildings and participated in building around 100 other vessels before it was closed in 1987 following the bankruptcy of Wärtsilä Marine. Later, the longest dry dock in Finland was used by various ship repair companies until the construction of the new Vuosaari harbour cut the connection to the sea in 2004. Despite various plans to re-use the old dry dock, now located inside the harbour perimeter, it remained without use until the basin was backfilled in 2015–2016.

== History ==
In 1946 a number of Finnish state-owned heavy industry enterprises were combined to a single conglomerate called Valtion Metallitehtaat (State Metalworks), which acquired several shipyards in Helsinki, Turku and Uusikaupunki. The first ships were oceangoing fishing trawlers built in Suomenlinna for the Soviet Union as part of the Finnish war reparations. In 1950 the company was incorporated and its name was shortened to Valmet Oy, and in the following year a new shipyard was built in Katajanokka in downtown Helsinki. After the war reparations had been paid in full, the future of the state-owned shipyard remained uncertain until the Suez Crisis in 1956, which increased the worldwide demand for new ships and brought new contracts for Valmet as well. Later the company constructed a long series of accommodation ships for the Soviet Union.

However, Valmet was not able to compete with private companies in the newbuilding market, and in 1963 a decision was made to switch focus on repairing existing ships and maintain only limited newbuilding capability on a single shipyard. When demand for new ships increased considerably in the mid-1960s, the shipbuilding strategy of Valmet changed considerably. As the size of new ships was expected to increase in the future, there was a danger that the state-owned shipbuilding company would not be able to compete in the lucrative newbuilding market. Since expanding the shipyard located in the middle of the capital city was deemed impossible, a decision was made to construct a completely new shipyard in Vuosaari.

The Vuosaari shipyard was built in 1971–1974. The new dry dock was 56 metres (184 ft) wide and 9.5 metres (31 ft) deep, but only 260 metres (853 ft) long at first. However, during the construction it was decided to lengthen it to 380 metres (1,250 ft) due to the growing demand of large crude oil tankers, making it the longest dry dock in Finland. (Note: The 380-metre (1,250 ft) dry dock of the former Vuosaari shipyard was longer than the dry docks at Perno shipyard (365 m (1,198 ft)), Helsinki New Shipyard (280 m (920 ft)), Turku Repair Yard (265 m (869 ft)) and Rauma shipyard (260 m (850 ft)).) Blocks weighing up to 500 tons could be constructed in the production halls and lifted to the construction basin with four 150-ton cranes. When the new shipyard was opened, Valmet also moved its two floating docks of 5,000 and 12,000 tons, used for maintenance and repair docking of smaller vessels, from Katajanokka to Vuosaari. An intermediate gate was built in 1984 so that part of the shipyard could be flooded while the other part was used for docking.

Between 1974 and 1987 Vuosaari shipyard delivered 33 new ships and participated in building around 100 other vessels. These include four 153,000 DWT crude oil tankers for Norwegian shipping company Klaveness in 1977–1979, four large barge carriers, ten SA-15 and SA-15 Super type Arctic cargo ships in 1983–1987, and the first large cruiseferry, Birka Princess for Birka Line, in 1986. The majority of the newbuildings were built for the Soviet Union. The last newbuilding, barge Espa for ESL Shipping, was delivered in 1987.

Vuosaari shipyard was merged with Wärtsilä in 1986 to form Wärtsilä Marine of which Valmet owned 30%. After the downturn in shipbuilding in the mid-1980s, the company decided to close the Vuosaari shipyard on 13 January 1987 and move the shipbuilding to Helsinki Shipyard in Hietalahti. In 1987–1991 various shipping companies rented the old shipyard from Wärtsilä for routine dockings. The cranes were sold in 1991, two to Germany and two to Rauma shipyard. Several ship repair companies operated in and around the old dry dock until 2004, when the construction of the new harbour cut the connection to the sea.

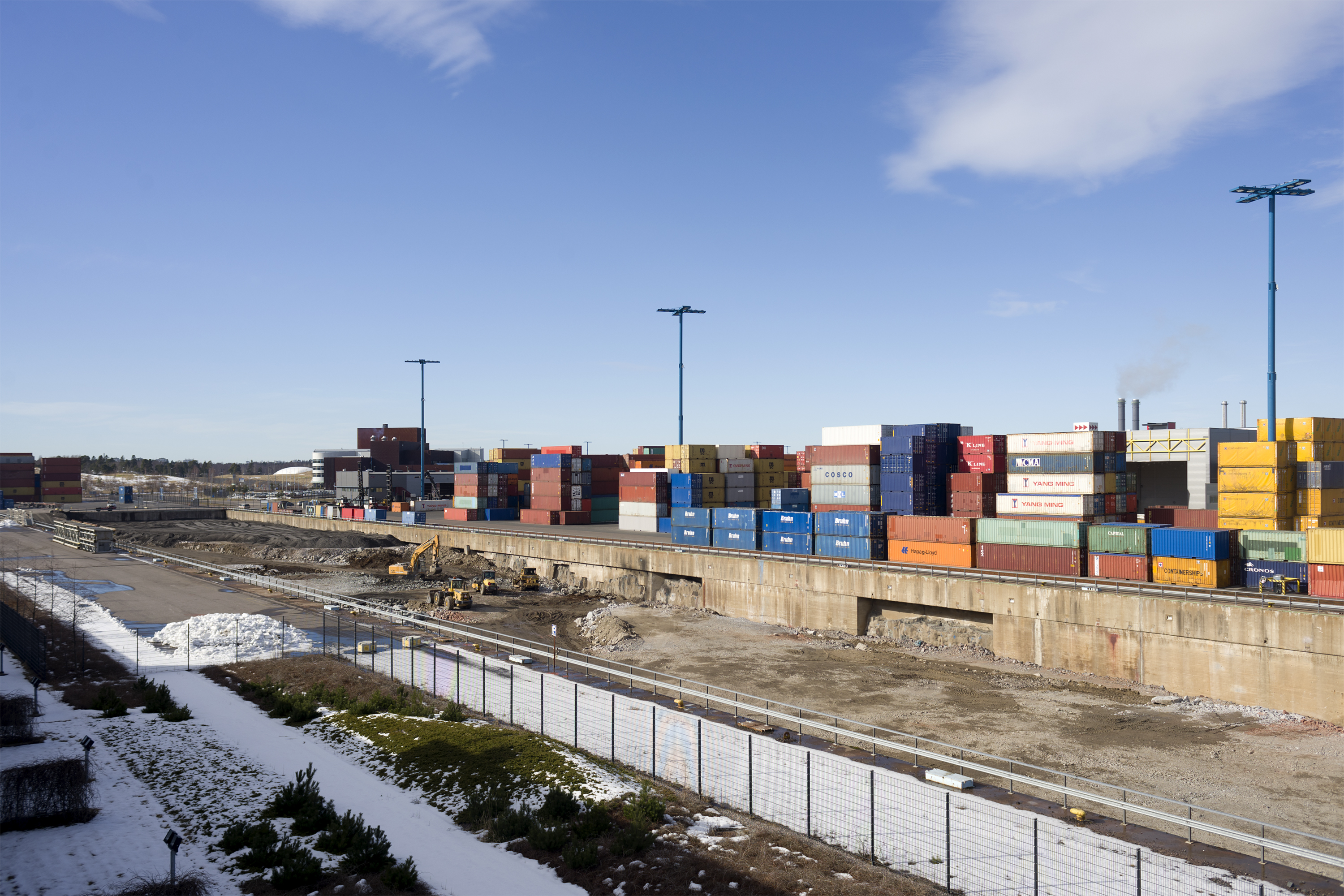
Partially backfilled dry dock in March 2016.

The old shipyard area has since been occupied by other companies. ABB Marine used the old block assembly halls for the construction of Azipods until 2007, Aker Arctic opened a new ice model test facility next to the old dry dock in 2006, and Paulig constructed a modern coffee roasting plant where the main gate of the Vuosaari shipyard once stood. Over the years most of the old buildings, such as the design office close to the dry dock gate, have been demolished. The intermediate gate was also later scrapped and its steel plating re-used in a barge.

While several ideas for re-using the old dry dock were presented over the years, nothing significant was ever realized. In 2008, the floor and walls of the basin were strengthened with concrete and a new wall was built in front of the old steel gate in preparation of using the basin for storage of empty shipping containers, but it was never used for this purpose. In late 2015, the Port of Helsinki began backfilling the dry dock in order to create an above-ground storage area for containers. The work was completed in 2016 and the area has now been paved over.

== Ships built in Vuosaari ==
Between 1974 and 1987 the following vessels were delivered from the Vuosaari shipyard with the exception of one crude oil tanker that received a yard number but was later cancelled. As of 2023, less than half of the newbuildings built at Vuosaari remain in service.

Ship name(s)	DWT	Year	Type (as built)	Yard number	IMO number	Status (1/2020)	Notes	Image	Ref
Magnitogorsk (1976–1996); Euroshipping Two (1996–1997); Daisy (1997–2000); Rosanne (2000–2004); Rosario (2004–2006); Naesborg (2006–2011)	22,690	1976	Ro-ro	282	7359553	Scrapped in 2011	Sister ships: Komsomolsk, Anatoliy Vasilyev and Smolensk.		
Komsomolsk (1976–1995); Kotlini (1995–1997); Nicole (1997–2000); Roxanne (2000–2006); Nordborg (2006–2009)	22,690	1976	Ro-ro	283	7359565	Scrapped in 2009			
Tebostar (1974–1994); Azerot (1994–2003); B.F.C.-I (2003); Delta I (2003–2004)	6,060	1974	Product tanker	284	7359577	Scrapped in 2004	The last ship launched from Katajanokka shipyard and the first ship delivered from Vuosaari shipyard. Broke in two after collision with container ship APL Pusan on 13 September 2004. Towed to Sachana, India, for scrapping.		
Sommerstad (1977–1983); Tornado (1983); Goktürk (1983–1996); Eliki (1996–2001)	153,200	1977	Crude oil tanker	285	7359589	Scrapped in 2001	Sister ships: Solstad, Sangstad, Siljestad and a cancelled fifth tanker. When the shipping company filed for bankruptcy in 1983, the ships were returned to Valmet, which resold them in 1983–1984.		
Solstad (1977–1983); Buyuk Hun (1983–1984)	153,200	1977	Crude oil tanker	286	7359591	Scrapped in 1986	Attacked by Iraqi fighters on 3 June 1984 while underway in ballast from Tutunciftlik, Turkey to Kharg Island, Iran. Two Exocet missiles hit the superstructure and the engine room, starting a fire, killing three crew members and injuring two. Later towed to Bushir, Iran, where declared total loss and sold to Taiwanese breakers in 1986.		
Sangstad (1978–1983); Altano (1983–1984); Avar (1984–1998); Ava (1998–1999); Eagle (1999–2003)	153,200	1978	Crude oil tanker	287	7359606	Scrapped in 2003			
Siljestad (1978–1983); Caldereta (1983–1984); Buyuk Timur (1984–1995); Westgate (1995–1996); Enalios Thetis (1996–2001); Glory Sea (2001–2003)	153,200	1978	Crude oil tanker	288	7359618	Scrapped in 2003			
NB Westfal-Larsen	153,200	—	Crude oil tanker	289	—	Cancelled			
Yulius Fuchik (1978–1998); Production Driller (1998–2002); Asian Alliance (2002–2003); Alliance (2003)	37,850	1978	Barge carrier	290	7505322	Scrapped in 2003	Featured in the novel Red Storm Rising by Tom Clancy. Sister ship: Tibor Szamueli.		
Tibor Szamueli (1979–1998); Development Driller (1998–2002); Asian Reliance (2002–2003); Reliance (2003); C Reliance (2003)	37,850	1979	Barge carrier	291	7505334	Scrapped in 2003			
Sibirskiy-2101	3,162	1980	Dry cargo ship	292	8862284	In service	Dry cargo river/sea ships built by Valmet for the Soviet Union, named Sibriskiy-2101–2109 and 2120–2129.		
Sibirskiy-2103 (1980–2013); Isabelle I (2013–2014); Madeleine I (2014–)	3,162	1980	Dry cargo ship	293	7801855	In service			
Sibirskiy-2105 (1980–2002); Kapitan Orlov (2002–)	3,162	1980	Dry cargo ship	294	7801879	In service			
Sibirskiy-2107 (1980–2000); Kapitan Pashnin (2000–)	3,162	1980	Dry cargo ship	295	7801893	In service			
Tebo Olympia (1980–2005); Angeles B (2005–2011)	11,474	1980	Product tanker	296	7813327	Scrapped in 2011			
Järvsaar (1979–1986); Sigrun (1986–1992); Geir (1992–1993); Gusti I Papey (1993–1995); Slettunupur (1995–1997); Arctic Sun (1997–2012)	60	1979	Winter trawler	297	7817062	Scrapped in 2012			
L-915 (1979–??); Kupeli	—	1979	Tugboat	298	—	In service			
Hankoniemi	—	1980	Transport boat	299	—	Decommissioned	Hauki class transport boat constructed in Kotka but delivered from the Vuosaari shipyard for the Finnish Navy. Decommissioned and sold to reservist organization in 2007. Sister vessels: Hirsala and Houtskär.	Pirkanmaa, ex-Hankoniemi	
Hirsala	—	1980	Transport boat	300	—	In service			
Houtskär	—	1980	Transport boat	301	—	In service			
Ahven 1 Ahven 2 Ahven 3 Ahven 4 Ahven 5 Ahven 6	—	1979	Training boat	302	—	Decommissioned	Six training and work boats for the Finnish Navy. Constructed in Kotka but delivered from the Vuosaari shipyard. Decommissioned and sold to civilians in the 2000s.		
Julanta (FIN-137-U)	60	1979	Winter trawler	303	—	Scrapped in 2005			
Anatoliy Vasilyev (1981–1997); Katsina (1997–1999); Jolly Celeste (1999–2000); Laura Delmas (2000–2002); Repubblica de La Boca (2002); Laura (2002–2004); Nds Prospector (2004–2008); Niledutch Prospector (2008–2010); Spector (2010)	22,447	1981	Ro-ro	304	7910656	Scrapped in 2010			
Smolensk (1981–1995); Euroshipping Three (1995–1996); Alyona (1996–2010)	22,447	1981	Ro-ro	305	7910668	Scrapped in 2010			
Vikla (1982–2004); Vikland (2004–2007); Lister (2007–2014)	8,288	1982	Product tanker	306	7924176	Scrapped in 2014	Sold to an undisclosed buyer in auction after a 76-day detention in Gibraltar in 2009. Classification withdrawn by Det Norske Veritas in 2009.		
Shelltrans (1982–1994); Acila (1994–1999); Bacalan (1999–2001); Vega Desgagnés (2001–2015); Fort Abel (2015–2016); Chukotka+ (2016–)	11,548	1982	Product tanker	307	7927960	In service			
Arctic Scan (1982–1983); Melkki (1983–2004); Sinimeri (2004–2005); Aegean Pride I (2005–2010); Pride (2010)	11,538	1982	Product tanker	308	8027195	Scrapped in 2010			
Polar Scan (1982–1983); Rankki (1983–2000); Omega af Donsö (2000–2006); Kingston (2006–2012); Reem-1 (2012–2014); Syros II (2014–2019); Lady Noor (2019–2020)	11,538	1982	Product tanker	309	8027200	Scrapped in 2019			
Nizhneyansk (1983–1996); Magdalena Oldendorff (1996–2003); Ocean Luck (2003–2010); Captain Kurbatskiy (2010–2011)	20,000	1983	Ro-ro/General cargo	310	8013065	Scrapped in 2011	SA-15 type arctic cargo ship. Sister ships built at Vuosaari: Okha, Bratsk, Kemerovo and Anadyr.		
Okha (1983–1995); Speybank (1995–2006); Mahinabank (2006–2009)	20,000	1983	Ro-ro/General cargo	311	8013077	Scrapped in 2009			
Bratsk (1983–1995); Arunbank (1995–2006); Tikeibank (2006–2009)	20,000	1983	Ro-ro/General cargo	312	8013089	Scrapped in 2009			
Rossvik	60	1981	Trawler	313	8027212	In service	Constructed in Kotka but delivered from the Vuosaari shipyard.		
Boris Polevoy (1984–2000); Smit Express (2000–2002); Midnight Express (2002–2006); Express (2006–2013); Lewek Express (2013–2020); Rhea Express (2020–)	8,770	1984	Barge carrier	314	8116049	In service	Converted to a pipe-laying ship in 2002. Sister ship: Pavel Antokolskiy.		
Pavel Antokolskiy (1984–1999); Smit Explorer (1999–2003); Explorer (2003–2011); Karadeniz Powership Zeynep Sultan (2011–)	8,770	1984	Barge carrier	315	8116051	In service	Converted to floating power station in 2011.		
Kemerovo (1983–2000); Marathon II (2000–2005); Professor Barabanov (2005–2012)	20,000	1983	Ro-ro/General cargo	316	8120662	Scrapped in 2012			
Anadyr (1984–2000); Emerald Sea (2000–2011)	20,000	1984	Ro-ro/General cargo	317	8120674	Scrapped in 2011			
Anatoliy Kolesnichenko	19,500	1985	Ro-ro/General cargo	318	8406688	Scrapped in 2012	SA-15 Super type arctic cargo ship. Sister ships: Kapitan Man, Yuriy Arshenevskiy, Vasiliy Burkhanov and Kapitan Danilkin.		
Kapitan Man	19,500	1985	Ro-ro/General cargo	319	8406690	Scrapped in 2012			
Yuriy Arshenevskiy	19,500	1986	Ro-ro/General cargo	320	8406705	In service			
Birka Princess (1986–2006); Sea Diamond (2006–2007)	2,441	1986	Cruiseferry	321	8406731	Sank in 2007	Sank on 5 April 2007 after running aground near the Greek island of Santorini on the previous day. Two French passengers remain missing.		
Vasiliy Burkhanov	19,500	1986	Ro-ro/General cargo	322	8406717	Scrapped in 2013			
Kapitan Danilkin	19,500	1987	Ro-ro/General cargo	323	8406729	In service			
Espa (1987–2022); Gamma (2022–)	8,540	1987	Barge	324	8618322	In service	Last newbuilding from the Vuosaari shipyard.		
