= Kapitan Man =

Russian Merchant Ship

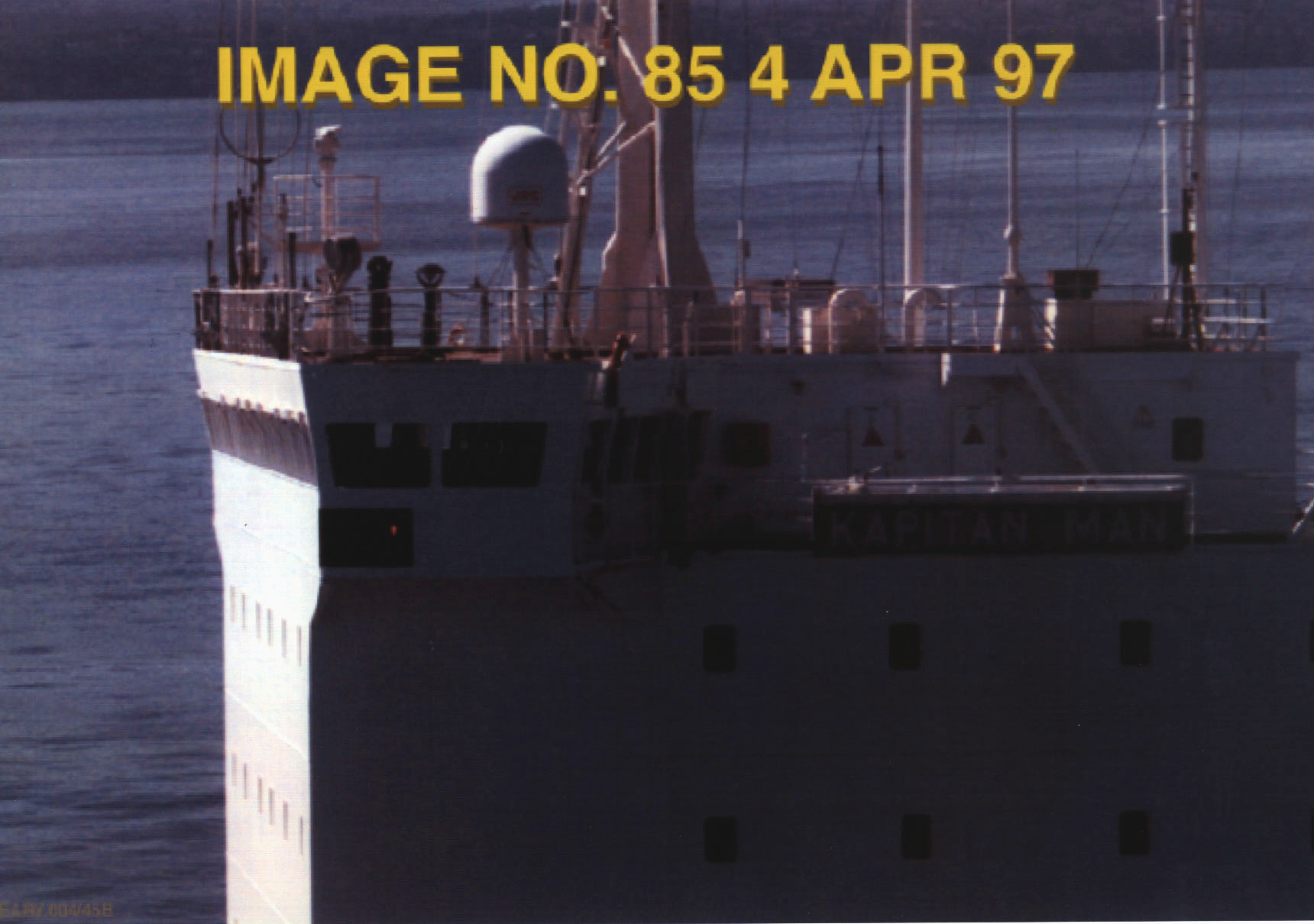
- A view of part of Kapitan Man, in Puget Sound near Seattle, Washington, on April 4, 1997.

History
- Name: Kapitan Man
- Owner: Far East Shipping Company (FESCO)
- Port of registry: Vladivostok
- Builder: Valmet Oy Vuosaari shipyard, Helsinki, Finland
- Yard number: 319
- Laid down: 1985
- Launched: December 9th 1985
- Out of service: May 15th 2012
- Identification: 8406690
- Fate: Scrapped in Chittagong

General characteristics
- Class & type: SA-15 Super type ro-ro/general cargo ship
- Tonnage: 18,574 GT; 22,845 DWT
- Length: 176.7
- Installed power: 2х7700
- Speed: 18.1

Kapitan Man (Russian: Капитан Ман) was a Russian SA-15 Super type multipurpose merchant ship (call sign UIFU). Part of a series of ships, she was designed to navigate the Arctic waters and was fitted with an ice-breaking bow. The ship was named after the Soviet polar explorer, captain Ivan Man (1903–82). She was reportedly sold for scrap in May 2012.

On 4 April 1997, the ship was a part of the Strait of Juan de Fuca laser incident between the Russian crew and Canadian and United States military. The ship had long been suspected of conducting covert espionage operations either for hire or for the Russian military.

Kapitan Man was owned by the Far East Shipping Company (FESCO) – a cargo outfit based in Vladivostok, Russia, with known ties to the Russian military. As further evidence of the espionage being conducted by FESCO, a joint U.S. Customs and Immigration and Naturalization Service (INS) inspection of the Kapitan Man in April 1993 found environmental data equipment – including sophisticated sonar equipment – used solely to conduct anti-submarine warfare (ASW).
