= Mari, Cyprus =

Mari
- Village
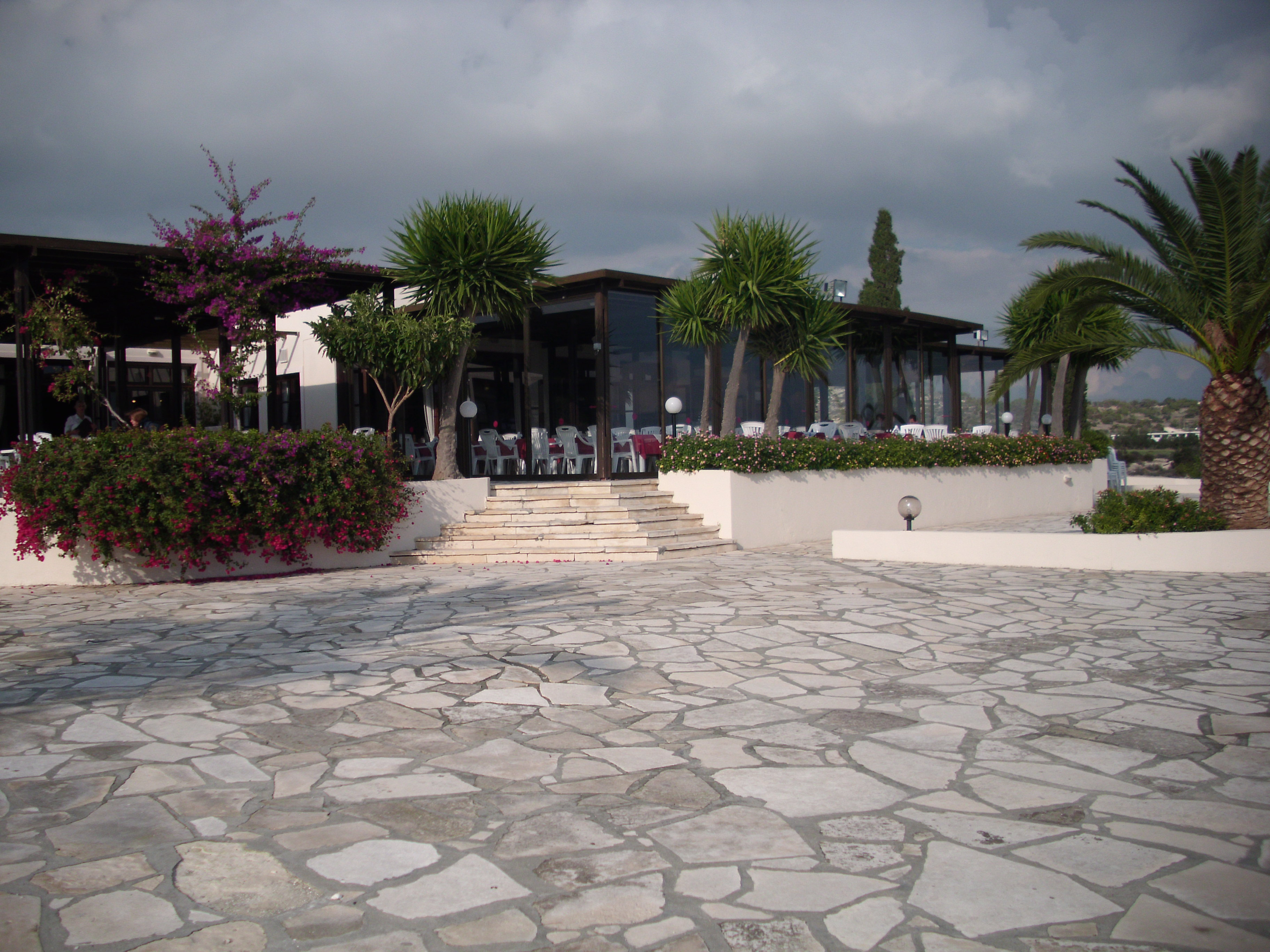
- Terrace at Kalymnos Beach

- Location in Cyprus
- Coordinates: 34°44′26″N 33°17′57″E
- Country: Cyprus
- District: Larnaca District

Population (2011)
  - Total: 158
- Time zone: UTC+2 (EET)
  - Summer (DST): UTC+3 (EEST)
- Website: http://www.mari.org.cy

Mari (Greek: Μαρί; Turkish: Tatlısu or Mari) is a village in the Larnaca District of Cyprus, located 5 km west of Zygi. The village was largely populated by Turkish Cypriots before 1974. In Turkish, it is known as Tatlısu ("sweet water").
