= Winterization =

Process of preparing something for winter

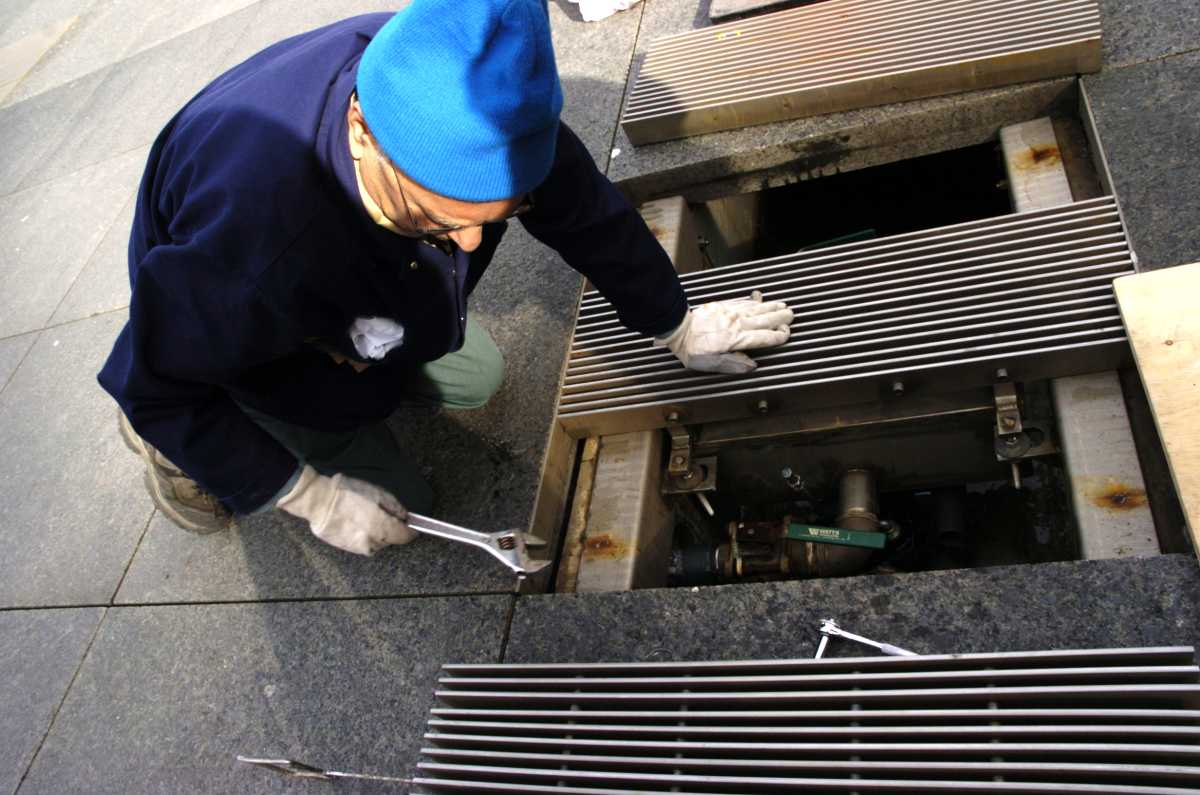
Winterization of Toronto's Sankofa Square usually takes place at the end of October

Winterization is the process of preparing something for the winter, and is a form of ruggedization.

Equipment suitable for year-round use can be said to have "built-in" winterization.

== Humanitarian aid ==
In emergency or disaster response situations, such as managed by the UNHCR, winterization activities include the distribution of items including blankets, quilts, kerosene, heating stoves, jerry cans, as well as thermal floor mats and insulation to make tents warmer and more resistant to harsh winter conditions.

== Summer home ==
Some summer homes, also known as cabins or cottages, were built for summer use only and need to be winterized each Autumn. This entails locking them up, turning off water, electricity, and phone lines, and protecting various features from heavy snowfall.

In the New England area, many wealthy families living in cities during the 19th century had summer homes in the mountains. This was to flee the onset of yellow fever and other epidemics which often struck in the summer months, when city plumbing problems and stagnant horse manure in the streets caused a health hazard. Winterization would take place each Fall when the families returned to the cities (often when school started). In those days, winterization just referred to a lock-down of all movable parts as protection from winter storms. An example of such a summer home that needs to be winterized each fall is the scene of the movie On Golden Pond, which was filmed on Squam Lake.

In the 20th century, these summer mountain homes in turn were winterized to enable winter holidays, as the popularity of skiing in the mountains surpassed that of summer camping. In this sense, winterization refers to the addition of modern amenities such as heating and insulation, often entailing a complete rebuild of the cottage.

In real estate, winterization refers to securing or preparing vacant properties to withstand or survive the harsh impacts of winter weather: this is similar to winterizing a home before the cold season arrives.

== Equipment ==
Equipment designed for use in particularly extreme cold conditions (such as the polar regions) also undergoes a "winterization" process. Many complex devices (automobiles, electronics and radios) as well as common materials (metals, rubbers, petroleum lubricants) are not designed to operate at extremely low temperatures and must be winterized to operate without severe damage from the elements in such conditions. This might involve a chemical treatment process, additional waterproofing/insulation, or even the total substitution of new parts. An example would be the internal combustion engine of an automobile; the installation of heaters on the engine block and battery as well as the substitution of winter-grade coolants and lubricants allows the vehicle to start and run in sub-freezing conditions where a non-winterized engine would quickly break down.

Winterization of equipment can be thought of as the winter-weather extension of ruggedization.

== Boats ==
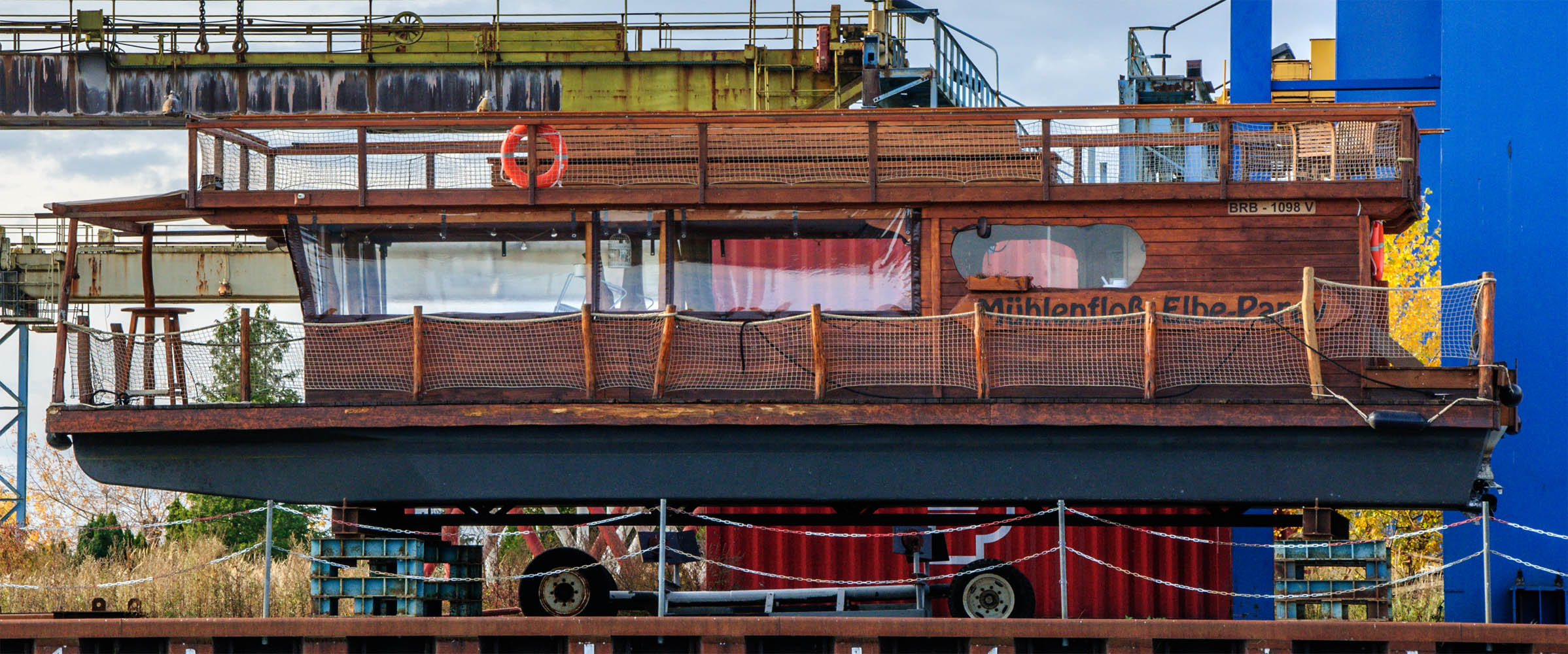
Raft being winterized in Elbe-Parey, October 2021.

Boats, boat lifts, personal watercraft, and other watercraft need to be properly winterized. This includes draining water from the hull, and the cooling system, inspect stern drive to remove plant life, add fuel, add oil to the engine, and clean the bilges. Thoroughly cleaning the interiors, draining any refrigerators, lock all drawers, and remove valuables. It is also important to properly shrink wrap a boat to protect from moisture, snow, ice, and debris.

Watercraft can be winterized and stored outdoors or in an indoor storage facility.

== Strategies for water features ==
Some fountains, such as the Ontario Science Centre FUNtain Hydraulophone and the flame fountain in Nathan Phillips Square, are designed to run year-round by virtue of heated water, whereas others require that the water be drained and that all apertures be covered to keep rainwater from entering the fountain and freezing inside. Fountains and other water features are often drained and sealed up so that water inside does not freeze or cause breakage of the pipes in the fountain.

Fish ponds require several additional steps to ensure that the fish are well taken care of. A properly maintained water feature containing fish can operate even in freezing temperatures. Steps should be taken to ensure adequate cleaning of the pond from any loose debris.

Irrigation sprinklers in cold climates need winterization.
