= Slamming =

Impact of the bottom of a ship onto the sea surface

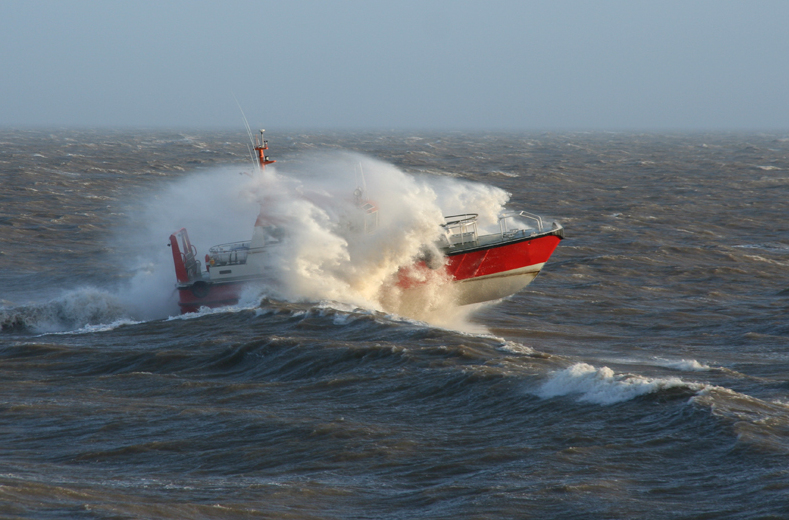

Slamming is the impact of the bottom structure of a ship onto the sea surface. It is mainly observed while sailing in waves, when the bow raises from the water and subsequently impacts on it. Slamming induces extremely high loads to ship structures and is taken into consideration when designing ships. Slamming is not strictly limited to ships but is observed in watercraft as small as kayaks. For trimarans and catamarans, slamming can occur when an ama slams back down into the sea after being lifted clear by wind or wave action. Slamming can also occur for multihull vessels when the sea strikes an area that is normally above water level and join the vessel's hulls together.

Slamming can occur in relatively mild sea conditions if the vessel is prone to pitching, which is more likely to occur aboard vessels where the bow and stern sections are both narrow.

== See also ==
- Ship collision
- MSC Napoli
