= V14 engine =

Type of internal combustion engine

A V14 engine is a V engine with 14 cylinders mounted on the crankcase in two banks of seven cylinders. It is a very rare layout, used almost exclusively on large medium-speed diesel engines used for power generation and marine propulsion.

== Marine use ==
MAN B&W offers V14 layout for its 32/40, 32/44CR, 48/60CR, 49/60DF, and 51/60DF engines, with outputs ranging from 7,000 to 18,200 kW (9,400 to 24,400 hp). MAN V14 engines have been installed on cruise ships such as the Explorer Dream and Norwegian Spirit, both of which have 14V48/60 engines producing 14,700 kW (19,700 hp) each, and on some cargo vessels. However, other major manufacturers do not normally offer medium-speed engines in the V14 configuration.

Wärtsilä has only recently begun to offer V14 versions of its latest engine models, the 31, 46F, and 46DF.

In the past, V14 engines have also been offered by other manufacturers. Between 1982 and 1987 nineteen SA-15 arctic cargo ships were built with two 14-cylinder Wärtsilä-Sulzer 14ZV40/48 engines producing 7,700 kW (10,300 hp). SEMT Pielstick, nowadays part of MAN B&W, also produced four-stroke engines with 14 cylinders in V-configuration (14PC2 and 14PC4). They were used for example on RFA Bayleaf, a Leaf-class support tanker of the Royal Fleet Auxiliary.

== See also ==
- Straight-14 engine
