= List of ship launches in 1985 =

The list of ship launches in 1985 includes a chronological list of all ships launched in 1985.

Date	Ship	Class / type	Builder	Location	Country	Notes
4 January	Mercandian Gigant	Type FV 2100 RoRo-ship	Frederikshavn Værft	Frederikshavn	Denmark	For Per Henriksen
12 January	Alaska	Ohio-class submarine	Electric Boat	Groton, Connecticut	United States	
21 January	Akishio	Yūshio-class submarine			Japan	
1 February	Pellworm	ferry	Husumer Schiffswerft	Husum	West Germany	For Neue Pellwormer Dampfschiffahrtsgesellschaft GmbH
6 February	La Motte-Picquet	Georges Leygues-class frigate			France	
8 February	Reuben James	Oliver Hazard Perry-class frigate	Todd Pacific Shipyards	San Pedro, California	United States	
2 March	Börde	Ohre-class barracks ship	VEB Peene-Werft	Wolgast	East Germany	For Volksmarine
4 March	Auckland Star	Refrigerated cargo ship	Harland & Wolff	Belfast	United Kingdom	For Blue Star Line.
11 March	Bunker Hill	Ticonderoga-class cruiser	Ingalls Shipbuilding	Pascagoula, Mississippi	United States	
15 March	Wellamo	Cruiseferry	Wärtsilä Helsinki Shipyard	Helsinki	Finland	For Effoa for Silja Line traffic
19 March	Uckermarck	Ohre-class Barracks ship	VEB Peene-Werft	Wolgast	East Germany	For Volksmarine
26 April	Anatoliy Kolesnichenko	SA-15 type cargo ship	Valmet Vuosaari shipyard	Helsinki	Finland	
26 April	Mercandian Continent	Type FV 2100 RoRo-ship	Frederikshavn Værft	Frederikshavn	Denmark	For Per Henriksen
27 April	SKR-201	Koni-class frigate	Werft 340	Zelenodolsk	Soviet Union	For Soviet Navy
5 May	Pacific Sandpiper	Nuclear fuel carrier	Appledore Shipbuilders Ltd.	Appledore	United Kingdom	For Pacific Nuclear Transport Ltd.
5 June	Mikhail Sholokhov	Dmitriy Shostakovich-class ferry	Stocznia Szczecinska im Adolfa Warskiego Warskiego	Szczecin	Poland	For Far Eastern Shipping
11 June	Shankush	Type 209 submarine	Howaldtswerke-Deutsche Werft	Kiel	West Germany	For Indian Navy
1 July	Canterbury Star	Refrigerate cargo ship	Harland & Wolff	Belfast	United Kingdom	For Blue Star Line.
3 July	Setoyuki	Hatsuyuki-class destroyer			Japan	
4 July	Hebridean Isles	Ferry	Cochrane Shipbuilders Ltd	Selby	United Kingdom	For Caledonian MacBrayne
12 July	Otso	Icebreaker	Wärtsilä Helsinki Shipyard	Helsinki	Finland	
20 July	Key West	Los Angeles-class submarine	Newport News Shipbuilding	Newport News, Virginia	United States	
9 August	Mercandian Arrow	Type FV 2100 RoRo-ship	Frederikshavn Værft	Frederikshavn	Denmark	For Per Henriksen
22 August	Mobile Bay	Ticonderoga-class cruiser	Ingalls Shipbuilding	Pascagoula, Mississippi	United States	
31 August	Olympia	Cruiseferry	Wärtsilä Perno shipyard	Turku	Finland	For Rederi AB Slite for Viking Line traffic
12 September	Kapitan Man	SA-15 type cargo ship	Valmet Vuosaari shipyard	Helsinki	Finland	
14 September	Nevada	Ohio-class submarine	Electric Boat	Groton, Connecticut	United States	
28 September	Homeric	Cruise ship	Meyer Werft	Papenburg	West Germany	For Home Lines
5 October	Henry J. Kaiser	Henry J. Kaiser-class replenishment oiler	Avondale Shipyard	Avondale, Louisiana	United States	
14 October	Cornwall	Type 22 frigate	Yarrow Shipbuilders	Glasgow	United Kingdom	
16 October	Asayuki	Hatsuyuki-class destroyer			Japan	
26 October	Jubilee	Holiday-class cruise ship	Kockums	Malmö	Sweden	For Carnival Cruise Lines
29 October	Birka Princess	Cruiseferry	Valmet Vuosaari shipyard	Helsinki	Finland	For Birka Line
2 November	Oklahoma City	Los Angeles-class submarine	Newport News Shipbuilding	Newport News, Virginia	United States	
7 November	Yavuz	Yavuz-class frigate	Blohm + Voss	Hamburg	West Germany	
14 November	Roebuck	Survey ship	Brooke Marine Ltd.	Lowestoft	United Kingdom	For Royal Navy.
30 November	Peter Pan	Cruiseferry	Schichau Seebeckwerft	Bremerhaven	West Germany	For TT-Line
14 December	Louisville	Los Angeles-class submarine	Electric Boat	Groton, Connecticut	United States	
14 December	Thomas S. Gates	Ticonderoga-class cruiser	Bath Iron Works	Bath, Maine	United States	
17 December	Berge Fjord	Ore carrier	Industrias Verolme Ishibras		Brazil	
20 December	Rautaruukki	Finnpusku pusher vessel	Hollming	Rauma	Finland	
Unknown date	Colliter	Workboat	David Abels Boatbuilders Ltd.	Bristol	United Kingdom	For Bristol City Council.
Unknown date	Danica White	Bulk carrier			Denmark	
Unknown date	Island Rose	Passenger launch	David Abels Boatbuilders Ltd.	Bristol	United Kingdom	For Puffin Cruises.
Unknown date	Leisure Scene	Passenger ship	J. Bolson & Son Ltd.	Poole	United Kingdom	For Blue Funnel Cruises.
Unknown date	Rebecca Elaine	Fishing Vessel	David Abels Boatbuilders Ltd.	Bristol	United Kingdom	For Hamble Fisheries Ltd.
Unknown date	Seeker	Fishing vessel	David Abels Boatbuilders Ltd.	Bristol	United Kingdom	For private owner.
Unknown date	S.H.M. 5	Barge	Babcock Marine Ltd.	Appledore	United Kingdom	For Shoreham Harbour Board.
Unknown date	Unity 2	Fishing vessel	David Abels Boatbuilders Ltd.	Bristol	United Kingdom	For private owner.
