= Herakles (pusher) =

Finnish pusher vessel

Coordinates: 60°29′43″N 18°50′59″E

- Herakles-Bulk photographed by a Finnish Border Guard helicopter during crew evacuation shortly before the vessel sank

Finland
- Name: 1967–1988: Into; 1988–2004: Herakles
- Owner: 1967–1982: Neste Oy; 1982–1988: Oy Hangon Hinaus Ab; 1988–2004: Alfons Håkans Oy Ab
- Port of registry: 1967–1982: Porvoo, Finland; 1982–1988: Hanko, Finland; 1988–2004: Turku, Finland
- Builder: Oy Laivateollisuus Ab, Turku, Finland
- Yard number: 243
- Completed: October 1967
- Refit: 1991
- Identification: IMO number: 6704191; Call sign: OGTC; MMSI: 230201000
- Fate: Sank in 2004

General characteristics (2004)
- Type: Pusher/Tug
- Tonnage: 621 GT; 187 NT; 112 DWT
- Length: 41.21 m (135.20 ft)
- Beam: 11.50 m (37.73 ft) (waterline); 14.40 m (47.24 ft) (coupling devices)
- Height: 38 m (124.67 ft)
- Draught: 4.50 m (14.76 ft)
- Ice class: 1B
- Installed power: 2 × Caterpillar 3606 DITA (2 × 2,030 kW)
- Propulsion: 2 × Ulstein F5840/41 ducted CPP, ⌀ 2.2 m (7.2 ft); 1 × Scania DSI 14 02/M 03 bow thruster (294 kW)
- Speed: 13 knots (24 km/h; 15 mph) (without barge)
- Crew: 8

Herakles was a pusher vessel owned by Finnish towing and marine salvage company Alfons Håkans Oy Ab. The ship, originally built as salvage tug Into in 1967, was converted to a pusher in 1991 to be chartered to Rautaruukki Oyj and later ESL Shipping Ltd as the third pusher vessel for the Finnpusku system, a Finnish integrated tug and barge system built in the mid-80s.

On 2 March 2004, while heading north with barge Bulk fully laden with coal, Herakles ran into trouble in the Bothnian Sea when both of her main engines began to fail in heavy weather. After the crew was evacuated the combination drifted to the shallows near Swedish Grundkallen lighthouse and was completely destroyed.

== Career ==
The vessel began her life as salvage tug Into and was delivered to the Finnish oil and petroleum products company Neste Oy by Oy Laivateollisuus Ab in October 1967.

In 1982 she was purchased by Oy Hangon Hinaus Ab, a marine salvage company recently acquired by Effoa. In the same year the ownership of the company was transferred to Neptun, another Finnish marine salvage company in which Effoa had been a major shareholder since 1917. The two companies merged in the following year, after which Neptun changed its name to Oy Hangon Hinaus Ab. When Effoa gave up salvage business in 1988 and sold Oy Hangon Hinaus Ab to Alfons Håkans Oy Ab, Into was renamed Herakles.

As part of a restructuring of the company Alfons Håkans converted two tugboats to become pushers and established a charter contract with Rautaruukki Oyj. In 1991 Herakles was refitted with a new bridge and coupling devices by Oy Laivateollisuus Ab in Turku, the same shipyard where she was originally built, and became the third pusher for the Finnish integrated tug barge system, Finnpusku, which is used to transport raw materials to the steel mills of Rautaruukki Oyj.

When the pushers and barges of the Finnpusku system were sold to ESL Shipping Ltd in 2003, Herakles continued her charter as part of the transport system until her demise in 2004.

== Technical details ==
As built, Into was fitted out with standard towing equipment, including a 700 kN towing hook, 245 kN towing winch and 600 m (2,000 ft) of towing cable (⌀ 40 mm (1.6 in)). Propulsion power was provided by two 6-cylinder Ruston & Hornsby ATCM 4-stroke diesel engines, each producing 1,074 kW (1,440 hp), driving two propellers, giving the tug a service speed of 13 knots and bollard pull of 255 kN. For manoeuvring she also had a bow thruster. Being a salvage tug, Into also had VK 150/6000 water and foam monitors with a range of 90 m (300 ft).

=== Conversion to pusher ===
In 1991 Herakles was converted to a pusher vessel by Oy Laivateollisuus Ab, Turku. The conversion also included refitting the existing barges with new coupling devices since Herakles, having considerably smaller breadth than the original Finnpusku pushers and a different hull shape, was incompatible with the original rigid three-point Wärtsilä Marine Locomotive coupling. Herakles and the barges were fitted with Japanese Articouple K articulated coupling system that, by forming a hinge between the two vessels, allowed free pitching of the tug relative to the barge.

The most visible change to Herakles was a new wheelhouse installed on top of a cylindrical pillar housing a spiral staircase, 14.2 m (47 ft) above the old superstructure. The original bridge was retained in full operating condition and could be used when the vessel was not pushing a barge. The forecastle was modified and strengthened to accept Articouple KD-350S hydraulic couplers, later installed in Turku Repair Yard, on both sides of the superstructure. Other changes included the removal of the towing winch and installation of a new auxiliary diesel generator, Caterpillar DITA 3512 producing 807 kW (1,082 hp), inside the former cargo hold aft of the superstructure to power the bow thruster of the barge. The propulsion gear was upgraded by installing new rudders, steering gear, Vulkan EZR elastic couplings, KaMeWa propeller blades and propeller ducts. The total cost of the conversion was FIM 10 million.

The conversion increased her gross and net tonnage from 600 GT and 180 NT to 621 GT and 187 NT, respectively. The refitted pusher was classified by Det Norske Veritas with class notation +1A1 R280 Pusher/Tug ECO ICE 1B, meaning that her Finnish-Swedish ice class was reduced to 1B from the original 1A.

The remaining towing and salvage equipment was retained for some time after the conversion so that, if necessary, Herakles could perform normal tug duties while not employed as a pusher. However, it appears that they were later removed completely as the towing gear was no longer listed for Herakles on Alfons Håkans's website unlike with the rest of the tug fleet, making her purely a pusher vessel.

=== Engine upgrade ===
In 1995 Herakles received new main engines, reduction gears, propeller shafts and propellers in Turku. The old Ruston & Hornsby diesel engines were replaced with two Caterpillar 3606 DITA medium speed diesel engines delivering 2,030 kW (2,720 hp) each, nearly twice the power of the old main engines. New controllable pitch propellers, propeller ducts, reduction gears and clutches were provided by Ulstein. While this upgrade greatly improved her operational capabilities and increased her bollard pull to 588 kN, she still remained underpowered in comparison with the original Finnpusku pushers.

== Sinking ==
Herakles sank along with the barge Bulk on 3 March 2004 at around 00:30 (UTC+02) in the Bothnian Sea. The combination, referred to as Herakles-Bulk, had left Oxelösund, Sweden, two days earlier and was heading north with the barge fully laden with coal. On 2 March she ran into a storm and the captain, not certain if the vessel could safely be turned around in such a sea state to seek shelter closer to the coast, decided to evacuate half of the crew by helicopter. When the port engine began overheating and later the starboard engine lost all power, Herakles-Bulk was no longer able to keep the bow into the wind and began to drift uncontrollably in the storm. The remaining crew was soon evacuated and shortly afterwards the combination foundered in the shallows near Grundkallen lighthouse.

While there were no deaths, both vessels became total losses and the fuel oil from the ruptured fuel tanks polluted Finnish and Swedish coastlines.

The sinking of Herakles-Bulk was the second major accident involving the vessels of the Finnpusku system. In 1990 pusher Finn capsized with barge Baltic outside Hanko, Finland, with a loss of eight lives after her cargo of ore concentrate shifted in heavy weather. In the past Herakles had been involved in several dangerous situations in heavy weather, including one in January 2002 in which four crew members were evacuated by an Estonian helicopter before the captain attempted to turn the combination to the wind near the Estonian coast.

=== Timeline of events ===
On 1 March 2004 Herakles-Bulk left Oxelösund where she had stopped while en route from Poland to Kvarken with a cargo of 13,259.9 metric tons of coal. The combination was heading north towards the edge of ice where she was supposed to rendezvous with pusher Rautaruukki coming from Luleå, Sweden, switch to an empty barge and head back south.

According to the weather forecast received two days earlier the strongest winds the ship would face would be 13 metres per second (29 mph; 25 kn), but after leaving Oxelösund another forecast was received, this time with maximum wind speed between 15 and 16 metres per second (34–36 mph; 29–31 kn). Later the chief officer noted to the captain that in the past the ship had sought shelter after receiving weather forecasts of this kind. Several sheltered locations had been marked to the nautical charts by the second officer, the closest being near Eckerö in Åland. The captain decided to keep heading north, but after passing Grundkallen lighthouse the ship would head closer to the sheltered waters of the Swedish coast.

Herakles-Bulk passed the Swedish lighthouse Svenska Björn at 04:00 the following night, encountering only a fresh westerly breeze in which the combination could maintain a speed of 8.2 knots (15.2 km/h; 9.4 mph). In the following morning the wind turned north and began to pick up, reducing the speed of the ship. After passing Märketskallen at 10:05 water began to enter the cargo hold over the forecastle and, as the waves gradually grew higher, the speed of the combination continued to drop until it was less than 2 knots (3.7 km/h; 2.3 mph) at 13:00.

At 15:00 steering was switched to manual mode since the autopilot could no longer be used and full engine power was required to maintain heading in such conditions. Herakles-Bulk was pushing the headwinds of 28 to 30 metres per second (63–67 mph; 54–58 kn) according to its own anemometer while barely maintaining a speed of 1 knot (1.9 km/h; 1.2 mph). The electrical cables and fuel pipes connecting the pusher to the barge were unplugged to prevent them from being damaged or damaging the ship as the pusher pitched violently within the notch. At 15:30 the operational management of the shipping company inquired about the situation and it was decided that company would contact the maritime rescue co-ordination centre (MRCC) which, in turn, would later contact the ship. When MRCC Turku contacted Herakles-Bulk at 15:51, the captain said that he was not sure if the bow could be kept facing the wind. He then decided to send half of the crew off the ship because there would be a danger of the vessel capsizing if the combination turned broadside to the wind.

At 19:00 overheating alarm was received from the cooling water system of the port main engine and its power had to be reduced to half. At times the engine had to be run at full power for short periods of time to keep the bow facing the wind. Shortly after 22:00 the speed of the starboard main engine suddenly dropped from 1,000 rpm to roughly 270 rpm, but was restored when the engine was declutched from the shaft. When the second engineer closed the clutch at the normal coupling speed of 400 rpm, the engine stalled. After restarting he attempted coupling the engine again at 1,000 rpm, but it still would not run faster than 270 rpm when connected to the shaft. When the captain received a report that the starboard main engine was no longer usable he decided to abandon the ship and ordered the evacuation of the remaining crew at 22:16. The combination turned parallel to the waves with port side facing the wind and began to drift uncontrollably.

After the rest of the crew had been evacuated Herakles-Bulk drifted to the shallows and sank near the Grundkallen lighthouse on 3 March 2004 at about 00:30.

=== Evacuation ===
When the captain made the decision to evacuate the chief engineer, who was suffering from gastroenteritis, the chief steward and two members of the deck crew, MRCC Turku gave the evacuation mission to Finnish Border Guard Eurocopter AS332 Super Puma OH-HVF which was returning from previous mission and still had more than two hours of remaining flight time. MRCC Göteborg authorized the Finnish helicopter to enter Swedish airspace as the combination was six miles into the Swedish territorial waters. The helicopter arrived and began lifting the crew members from the rear part of the cargo hold at around 16:50, a task that was very difficult due to pitching and rolling of the combination. The crew was brought to Mariehamn where they were supposed to spend the night and then return to the ship in the morning. They didn't learn until morning that the combination had sunk.

Although Herakles-Bulk did not declare an emergency or send a distress signal, MRCC Turku asked the Swedish search and rescue helicopters to maintain readiness in case the remaining crew had to be evacuated. Another Super Puma operated by the Finnish Border Guard, OH-HVG, took off from Turku and, after flying past Herakles-Bulk, landed in Mariehamn to wait with its engines running. The Finnish helicopter performed another flyby after the port engine began overheating.

MRCC Turku handed over the operational responsibility to MRCC Göteborg at 21:58 and shortly afterwards Herakles-Bulk requested the evacuation of the remaining crew. MRCC Göteborg gave the mission to OH-HVG, but MRCC Turku requested a Swedish search and rescue helicopter Rescue 996, a Sikorsky S-76 operated by Norrlandsflyg from Sundsvall, to be sent to the scene to assist with the evacuation. When OH-HVG arrived on the scene at 22:45, it was decided to lift the remaining crew members, the chief officer, the second officer and the second engineer, from the sea due to the large motions of the drifting combination. Herakles-Bulk was just two cable lengths (0.37 km; 0.23 mi) from the Grundkallen lighthouse when the captain left the ship. As he and the Finnish rescue swimmer were engulfed by a wave, the cable was severed and both men had to be rescued by the Swedish helicopter.

=== Causes ===
The foundering of Herakles-Bulk was a result of loss of steering ability which was caused by malfunctions in the main engines due to severe weather conditions. Since no engine parts were recovered from the wreck, the investigation board could not determine a definite cause of the engine problems.

==== Engine failure ====
The most likely reason for the overheating of the port engine was the plate heat exchanger getting clogged by small pieces of coal that had washed overboard from the cargo hold and entered the cooling system via the port side sea chest. The starboard engine was not affected because it used a separate sea water intake in the bottom of the vessel. Another possible cause was the development of hairline cracks in the cylinder liner or head due to large variations in engine load, allowing hot exhaust gases to mix with the cooling water.

Since the starboard engine ran normally after it was decoupled from the reduction gear, a likely reason for the sudden drop of engine speed from 1,000 to 270 rpm and subsequent stalling when reconnected was increased load in the propulsion system due to damaged shaft bearing or a foreign object, perhaps something that had fallen from the deck, wedged in the propeller duct, although malfunction in the fuel supply and lubrication system due to the violent pitching of the vessel were not ruled out.

==== Weather conditions ====
On 2 March 2004 the weather in the Bothnian Sea gradually developed into a force 10 storm on the Beaufort scale, with average wind speed around 25 m/s (56 mph; 49 kn) and gusts exceeding 30 m/s (67 mph; 58 kn). At midnight, shortly before Herakles-Bulk sank, the ten-minute average at Svenska Högarn was 30 m/s (67 mph; 58 kn) with three-second gusts of almost 33 m/s (74 mph; 64 kn). The freezing temperatures combined with strong wind and high waves resulted in fast icing of the ship structures.

In 1992 the Finnish Maritime Administration issued a wind limit of 14 m/s (31 mph; 27 kn) for Herakles due to the pusher's low engine power and poor performance in heavy weather. The shipping company also had its own instructions regarding the safe operation of the pusher-barge combination. The wind limit was removed in 1993 for cargoes other than the ore concentrate by the Finnish Maritime Administration, but captains were obliged to follow the instructions given by the shipping company. The captain of Herakles-Bulk was aware of the limitations given in the past, but thought that they had been revoked after the engine upgrade in 1995. According to him and the rest of the crew the pusher had successfully sailed in similar or even heavier weather in the past.

=== Aftermath ===
==== The wreck ====
As the wreck was later inspected it was found out that when the combination sank, the coupling devices failed and Herakles separated from Bulk. The pusher, found lying on its starboard side in the depth of 25 metres (82 ft), apparently capsized while still within the notch of the barge. The superstructure was torn away and the upper wheelhouse was not found. The hull had ruptured and half of the engine room was destroyed, scattering pieces of machinery in a large area around the site. The barge had broken in two, with an approximately 95-metre (312 ft) long section lying on an even keel only tens of metres from the lighthouse. Part of the side structure and a ramp protrude above the surface. Another section, approximately 60-metre (200 ft) long, was about 300 metres (980 ft) south-southeast from the lighthouse, with the forecastle of the barge protruding in an oblique angle above the surface. The cargo of coal had disappeared from the hold. The wrecks do not pose a hazard to navigation.

Herakles and Bulk were removed from the Finnish merchant fleet on 13 January 2009.

Grundkallen lighthouse received superficial damage when the combination collided with it.

==== Environmental damage ====
According to the tank situation report filed by the shipping company Herakles contained approximately 86 m^{3} (541 barrels) of marine gas oil (MGO) in eight fuel tanks, 2.5 m^{3} (16 barrels) of lubrication oil and 0.5 m^{3} (3 barrels) of hydraulic oil at the time of the sinking. There were also 70 tons (approximately 70.7 m^{3} or 445 barrels) of heavy fuel oil and 60 m^{3} (377 barrels) of marine gas oil in the fuel storage tanks of Bulk, and some fuel and lubrication oil in the generator room.

On 4 March, one day after the sinking, Swedish Coast Guard arrived on the scene and on the following day sent a remotely operated vehicle to search for oil in the wreck. Alfons Håkans's own tugboat Turso also arrived at the scene on 6 March and divers were sent to assess the damage of the wreck. Difficult ice conditions stopped the diving operations several times.

Swedish Coast Guard detected an oil slick with an approximate diameter of 350 metres (1,150 ft) drifting west of the island of Bodskär on 8 March. Clean-up began on the following day from the shores of Bodskär, Rödskär and Garpen islands where oily ice was collected into containers to be melted. During the following days several vessels of the Swedish Coast Guard arrived at the scene and began the difficult task of collecting and separating oil that had mixed with drift ice. By 17 March three vessels had managed to collect only 5 m^{3} (31 barrels) of heavy fuel oil. Later more oil was also found around Hållet and Blåbådan. Some heavy fuel oil from Bulk and flotsam was also found on the shores of various islands near Eckerö in April.

Later inspections revealed that nearly all tanks in both Herakles and Bulk had ruptured, spilling their contents to the sea. On 1 April Turso removed approximately 4 m^{3} (25 barrels) of fuel oil and 500 liters (3 barrels) of hydraulic oil from the generator room of the barge, but in the end some 200 tons of oil remained in the sea.
