= Steel (pusher) =

Finnish ship built in 1987

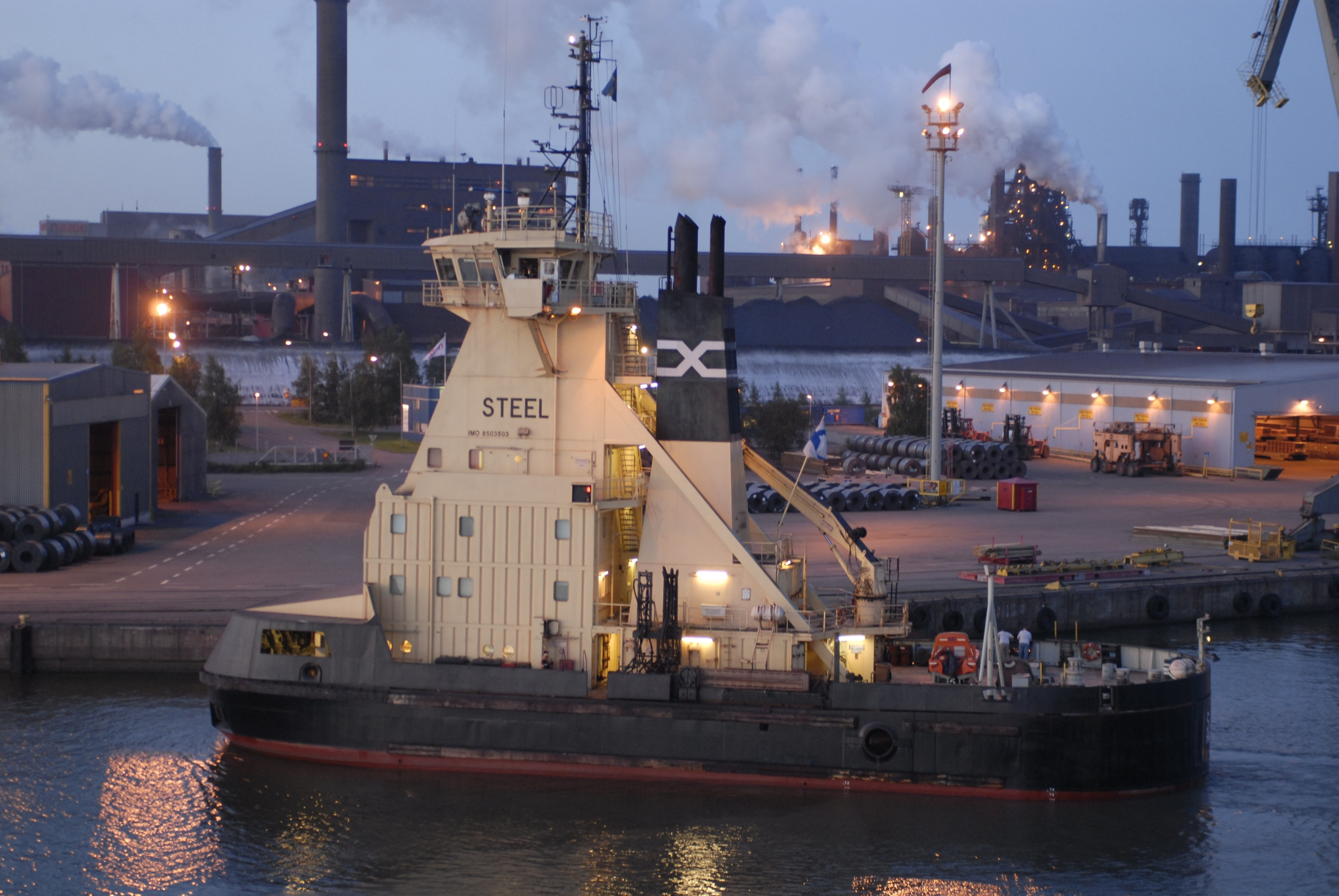
- Pusher Steel without a barge in the port of Raahe.

History
- Name: 1987–1991: Finn; 1991–: Steel
- Owner: 1987–1991: Laivanisännistöyhtiö Puskija; 1991–1993: Laivanisännistöyhtiö Steel; 1993–1995: Suomen Asiakasrahoitus Oy; 1995–2003: Merita Rahoitus Oy; 2003–present: ESL Shipping Ltd
- Operator: 1987–2003: Oy Finnlines Ltd; 2003–present: ESL Shipping Ltd
- Port of registry: Helsinki, Finland
- Ordered: 14 March 1985
- Builder: Hollming Oy, Rauma, Finland
- Yard number: 263
- Laid down: 7 November 1985
- Launched: 9 May 1986
- Completed: 28 April 1987
- Identification: IMO number: 8503503; Call sign: OIVR; MMSI number: 230202000
- Status: In service

General characteristics
- Type: Pusher
- Tonnage: 1,562 GT; 469 NT; 431 DWT
- Displacement: 2,230 tons
- Length: 41.7 m (136.8 ft) (overall)
- Beam: 14.37 m (47.1 ft) (waterline); 15.5 m (50.85 ft) (bridge wings)
- Draught: 6.7 m (22.0 ft)
- Depth: 10.0 m (32.8 ft)
- Ice class: 1A Super
- Installed power: 2 × Wärtsilä-Sulzer 6ZAL40 (2 × 3,840 kW)
- Propulsion: Single shaft; 4.7 m (15.4 ft) variable pitch propeller; Bow thruster (680 kW)
- Speed: 13.4 knots (24.8 km/h; 15.4 mph)
- Crew: 9

Steel is a Finnish pusher vessel owned and operated by ESL Shipping. It is part of the Finnpusku integrated tug and barge system developed in the 1980s by Finnlines, a Finnish shipping company that also managed the vessel until 2003, in co-operation with Rautaruukki for the transportation needs of the steel company. The vessel, built by Hollming in Rauma, Finland, as Finn, was delivered on 28 April 1987 and has since been used mainly to supply raw materials to the Raahe Steel Works.

On 27 December 1990 the vessel capsized along with the barge Baltic outside Hanko, Finland, while en route from Raahe to Koverhar in southern Finland with a cargo of iron ore concentrate. The cargo shifted in heavy weather, resulting in the loss of stability and the vessel capsizing in 10–15 seconds. Seven crew members and a pilot lost their lives in the accident, but the chief engineer and chief officer survived in an air pocket in the aftmost part of the engine room and were later rescued through a hole cut in the bottom. The combination was later rightened and towed to Rauma for rebuilding. Finn returned to service as Steel and Baltic as Botnia in 1991.

Steel has an identical sister vessel, Rautaruukki, which was delivered in 1986.

== Development and construction ==
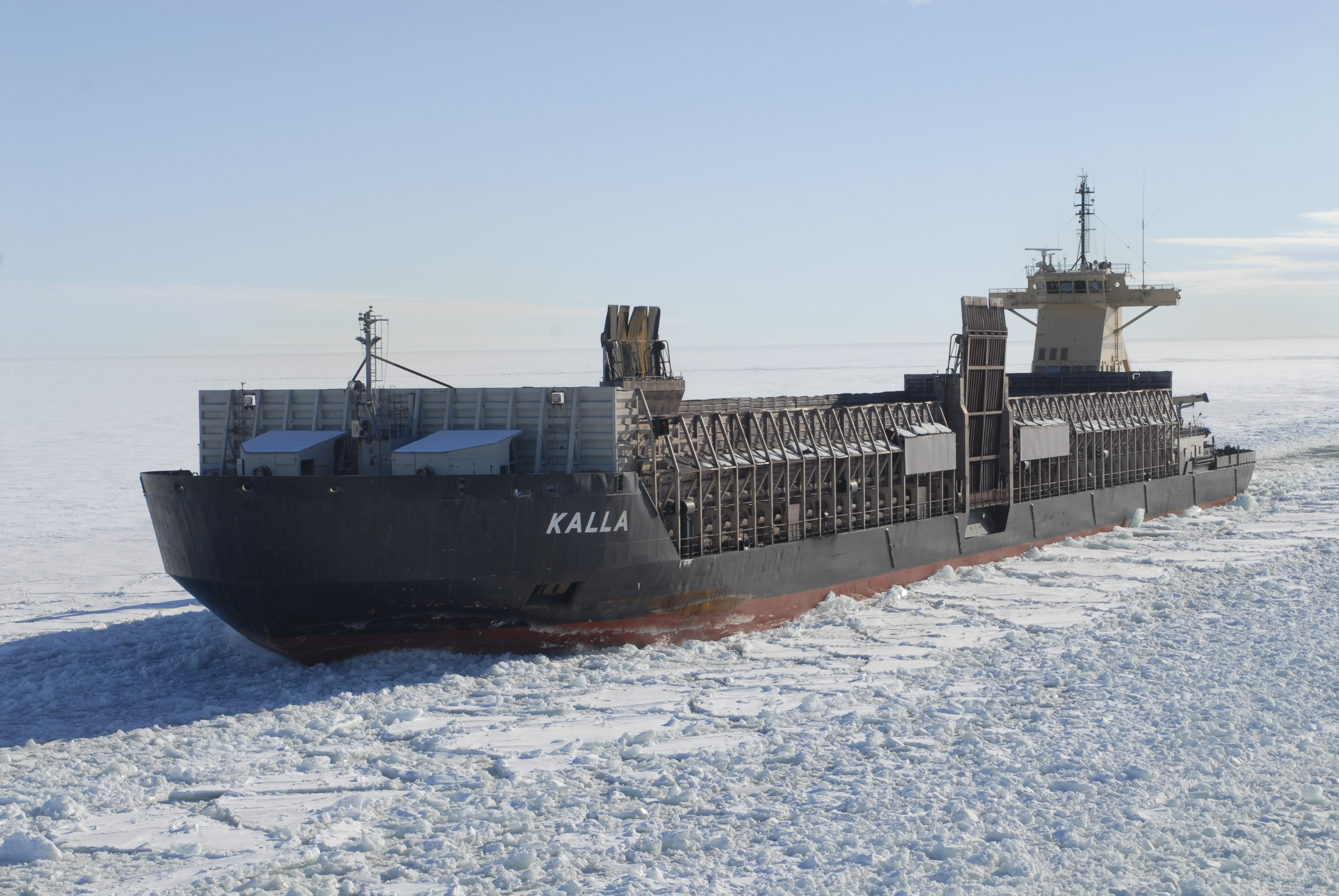
Rautaruukki, the sister vessel of Steel, and Kalla outside Luleå, Sweden.

The development of the Finnpusku system dates back to the 1960s when Finnlines developed the first version of the icegoing pusher-barge system. While the concept was not pursued further due to various problems, an upgraded version was developed in the 1970s. In the late 1970s Rautaruukki Oy began transporting raw materials to the steel mill in Raahe by towed barges and found them suitable for the steel company's transportation needs. However, due to the poor maneuverability of the barges and their inability to operate in winter conditions, Rautaruukki decided to investigate if it would be possible to design a pusher-barge system that could also be operated in ice conditions. When Finnlines was consulted, it presented the Finnpusku system it had developed and the two companies signed a development contract. Later Finnlines performed several feasibility studies which showed that a pusher-barge system would be the most economical and efficient method of transporting bulk cargoes on the relatively short routes of the Baltic Sea.

The initial plan was to establish shipping companies for each vessel of the Finnpusku system under the joint ownership of several large Finnish industrial and shipping companies, including Rautaruukki and Finnlines, which would also manage the vessels. However, due to delays in negotiations, Rautaruukki, concerned about the continuous supply of raw materials to the Raahe Steel Works, decided to order one pusher and two barges for itself. A follow-up order for another pusher and three more barges was signed by joint shipping companies "Puskija", "Proomu I", "Proomu II" and "Proomu III", formed by Effoa Oy (20%), Oy Finnlines Ltd (16%), Hollming Oy (10%), Neste Oy (25%), Palkkiyhtymä Oy (10%), Oy Paratug Ltd (5%), Rautaruukki Oy (9%) and Thomesto Oy (5%), on 14 March 1985. The second pusher of the Finnpusku system, Finn, was laid down on 7 November 1985 and launched on 9 May 1985.

Pusher Steel and barges Baltic, Board and Bulk, built by a Portuguese shipyard Estaleiros Navais de Setubal in Setúbal and outfitted in Rauma, were delivered to their respective joint shipping companies on 28 April 1987. When the two pushers and five barges of the Finnpusku system entered service in 1986–1987, it was estimated that they would carry one third of the ten million tons of bulk cargo arriving in Finland by sea every year.

== Career ==
While the first pusher, Rautaruukki, was used since the beginning solely to supply the Raahe Steel Works with raw materials, the jointly owned pusher Finn was time-chartered by the transportation department of Rautaruukki only when the steel company required additional capacity. The pusher-barge combinations transported different bulk cargoes from various ports of the Baltic Sea, such as limestone from the port of Storugns in Gotland, iron ore concentrate from Luleå, Sweden, and coal from various Eastern European ports. In addition the jointly owned pusher and barges were also used for other cargoes such as lumber by the owner companies and, to reduce the number of southbound ballast legs, the pusher-barge combinations carried occasional iron ore concentrate and pellet cargoes from Luleå to various ports in the Baltic Sea for the Swedish mining company LKAB.

Due to the difficulties in the timing of the transportation needs of Rautaruukki and Finnlines the time-chartering of the second pusher did not fulfill the requirements of the steel company's raw material supply schedule. It was decided to transfer the ownership of the pusher Finn and barges Baltic, Board and Bulk to new joint shipping companies owned by Rautaruukki Oy (95%) and Oy JIT-Trans Ltd (5%). Once all vessels were under the control of a single company, these issues disappeared and the Finnpusku system was found out to be suitable for the transportation needs of Rautaruukki in both port-to-port transport and lightening large bulk carriers outside the port of Raahe. By the end of 1987 the amount of cargo transported by the Finnpusku system, 7.5 million tons per year, had grown beyond the capability of the transportation department that was under the central administration of the steel company, so on 1 May 1988 a subsidiary company, JIT-Trans, was established to deal with both the parent company's own cargoes and external shipping business.

Finn was rebuilt after capsizing and returned to service in 1991 as Steel under the ownership of a new jointly owned shipping company. Later the ownership of the pushers and barges was transferred to a Finnish financial institution Suomen Asiakasrahoitus, later known as Merita Rahoitus and nowadays as Nordea Rahoitus.

In July 2003 a seven-year contract for the transportation of raw materials in the Baltic Sea was signed between JIT-Trans and Aspo Group. As part of the agreement, worth 140 million euros, the ownership and management of the Finnpusku system was transferred to ESL Shipping, a subsidiary of the Aspo Group. In February 2011 ESL Shipping signed a new long-term contract with Rautaruukki for the transportation of the raw materials of the steel industry in the Baltic Sea. The pushers and barges of the Finnpusku system was docked at Arctech Helsinki Shipyard and modernized by STX Finland Lifecycle Services during the summer of 2011. Steel arrived at Helsinki for modernization in mid-August and left couple of weeks later.

== Capsizing in 1990 ==
=== Final voyage ===
Finn-Baltic left the port of Raahe with a cargo of 13,398 tons of Malmberget A Fines (MAF) iron ore concentrate bound for the steel factory of Koverhar in Hanko, southern Finland, on 25 December 1990. Baltic had been loaded in Luleå, Sweden, on 21 December and brought to Raahe by the pusher Rautaruukki on the following day to wait for transit to the south. During its stay in Raahe, the barge developed a list of 1–2 degrees to port and the harbour workers noted that the cargo seemed to be wet and some of the ore heaps had collapsed.

After the harbour pilot had left the ship the combination turned southwest and headed towards the Kvarken in heavy head seas. To prevent water splashing over the forecastle and wetting the cargo only one main engine was running and the ship made headway at only four knots. When Finn-Baltic passed the Ulkokalla lighthouse, the second main engine was turned on to improve the maneuverability of the vessel, increasing its speed to around six knots. However, this also increased the amount of water entering the cargo hold every time the bow slammed to a wave and the watch officer, who used searchlights to monitor the state of the cargo, noticed that more ore heaps had collapsed. Later in the evening the combination passed the lighthouse and pilot station of Tankar, and the wind seemed to calm down.

On 26 December, Finn-Baltic continued its journey south past the lighthouses of Nordvalen and Kaskinen while maintaining an average speed of 6–7 knots in heavy head seas. In daylight the chief officer noticed that in the forward part of the cargo compartment three or four ore piles had collapsed to half of their original height and the others appeared to be wet. Sea water flowed continuously to the hold and washed ore to the sea through the storm shutters on the sides. However, during the last watch of the day the weather seemed to calm down again.

In the following morning, Finn-Baltic continued along the southwestern coast past the pilot stations of Isokari, Kustavi and Turku. The captain was concerned about the upcoming turns near Hanko because the weather forecast predicted wind speeds up to 25 m/s (49 knots). He also noted to the pilot that the cargo was probably wet because water had been splashing over the bow since leaving Raahe and suggested stopping at Hanko to wait for the weather to calm down. After changing the pilot for the last time at noon, Finn-Baltic continued past Hanko towards the port of Koverhar, heading first east and then southeast along the outbound shipping lane from the port of Hanko. The wind speed, measured at the nearby island of Russarö, was 16 to 18 metres per second (31–35 kn) from the south.

=== Capsizing ===
Finn-Baltic was tracked by radar from the pilot station of Hanko until around 12:15, when the pilot on duty noted that the combination had turned east and was heading towards Koverhar. When he returned to the radar half an hour later, he immediately noticed that Finn-Baltic had stopped and was drifting north by east at roughly one knot. However, he assumed that due to heavy weather and bad visibility the pilot onboard had decided to turn the combination back. He resumed tracking the vessel, but there was no change in speed or heading until Finn-Baltic disappeared from the radar screen ten minutes later. The low visibility due to snowing prevented him from seeing the vessel even though its last recorded location was only a bit over 2 nmi (3.7 km) from the pilot station — the location of the capsizing, based on the location of the ore concentrate cargo and debris that remains in the bottom to this day at a depth of 35 metres (115 ft), is 59°47′39.2″N 22°59′16.0″E.

While there were no external witnesses of the capsizing of Finn-Baltic, it was noticed by several people on the shore shortly afterwards and the rescue operation began within minutes of the accident even though the ship had not sent a distress signal. Around 12:30 the harbour bailiff of the Port of Hanko saw something odd amid the waves while standing at the window of his office. At first he thought it was just a barge being towed by a tug, but after spotting first the red bottom of the vessel and then its propeller and rudder, he realized that a ship had capsized in the storm and immediately contacted the captain of the rescue vessel Russarö, who alerted the Maritime Rescue Sub-Centre (MRSC) of Hanko at 12:40. At the same time a harbour worker standing on one of the easternmost quays saw something that resembled a new island in the middle of the storm. At first he, too, thought that it was just a towing, but was bothered by several strange details in the barge, such as the bow thruster, and decided to go get binoculars. When he came back to get a better view, he saw Russarö heading out. Finn-Baltic was also photographed only minutes before the combination capsized by a harbour worker, who remembered hearing a rumbling sound, like a freight train, shortly after taking the picture of the ship.

According to the chief engineer, who was in the engine control room at the time of the accident, the vessel suddenly heeled port around 12:30 and would not righten itself. Within the next 10–15 seconds, the list increased to 4–5 degrees and, after briefly stopping at 10 degrees, Finn-Baltic capsized. At the same time, the chief officer noticed that the ship had developed a permanent list to port, realized that something was wrong and decided to head to the bridge. However, when he got to the door of his cabin, the combination turned over and he was washed away by the water flowing through the broken cabin window. The rising water column carried the chief officer upwards in the staircase until, only seconds from drowning, he arrived at the corridor next to the ship's sauna, which was below the main deck and thus above the surface.

After capsizing the main engines of Finn-Baltic immediately went out and the emergency diesel generator started automatically. However, it ran only for a short time and after a while even battery-operated lights dimmed and died out. The chief engineer heard someone yelling in the darkness and found the chief officer from the corridor outside the control room in a shock-like state. After getting a case of soft drinks from the ship's stores and dry clothes for the chief officer they waited several hours in the switchboard room, until the rising water forced them to move to the aftmost part of the engine room next to the propeller shaft. Even before the accident the chief engineer had planned to find his way to this location in case the vessel capsized because there was no double bottom and, once free of its cargo, the combination would stay afloat upside-down. After 20 minutes they heard someone banging the hull outside the ship.

=== Rescue operation ===
When MRSC Hanko received the distress call from Russarö, three coast guard officers were immediately dispatched to the rescue vessel. When Russarö confirmed that a large vessel, approximately 150 metres (490 ft) in length, had capsized near the Flatkubb skerry, the Maritime Rescue Coordination Centre (MRCC) of Helsinki was alerted and a request to dispatch as many boats and personnel as possible to aid with the search and rescue operations was sent to the fire department of Hanko. When MRSC Hanko asked for a helicopter, MRCC Helsinki dispatched OH-HVE, a Finnish Border Guard Agusta-Bell AB 412 that had already been at high readiness at Helsinki-Malmi Airport after another vessel, Transgermania, had declared an emergency after grounding outside the island of Utö in the Gulf of Finland.

OH-HVE arrived at the Coast Guard station of Hanko three hours after the accident with one diver from the Border Guard and two from the Helsinki Rescue Department. In the meantime a professional diver from Hanko had also been called to the scene by the fire department and arrived shortly afterwards, after which four divers were airlifted to the upturned vessel at 16:45. Another helicopter, a Finnish Air Force Mil Mi-8 HS-13, arrived two hours after the chief one with two more divers and the Air Rescue Detachment (LEKA) from the Helsinki Rescue Department. A third helicopter, a Finnish Border Guard Eurocopter AS332 Super Puma OH-HVF, arrived at Hanko later in the evening. Vessels from the Border Guard, the Navy and Alfons Håkans, a Finnish salvage company, also participated in the rescue efforts.

While waiting for equipment, the divers began knocking the bottom of the pusher to find out if there was anyone trapped inside the capsized vessel and shortly afterwards established contact with the chief engineer and the chief officer. Shouting through the bottom, the divers told the trapped crew members that they were attempting to dive into the engine room from outside, after which those inside asked if it was possible to cut a hole to the bottom. When they were told that the rescuers were not sure yet if it was safe, the crewmen informed the divers that they were not in immediate danger although the air was becoming hard to breadth due to oil fumes. After diving inside the vessel was deemed to be impossible due to the heavy seas and the slight movement between the pusher and the barge indicated that the vessel was grounded and thus not in danger of sinking, it was decided to make a hole to the bottom to rescue the trapped crew members.

Based on signals given by the trapped crew members and information received from the representative of the shipping company and the technical director of the shipyard, two members of the LEKA team make a hole to the bottom plating with a gasoline-powered cutter while the divers held them in place with safety ropes. When the hull was breached, the overpressure inside was released and the steel plate was thrown in the air. After having been rescued the crew members were flown to the local hospital.

=== Aftermath ===
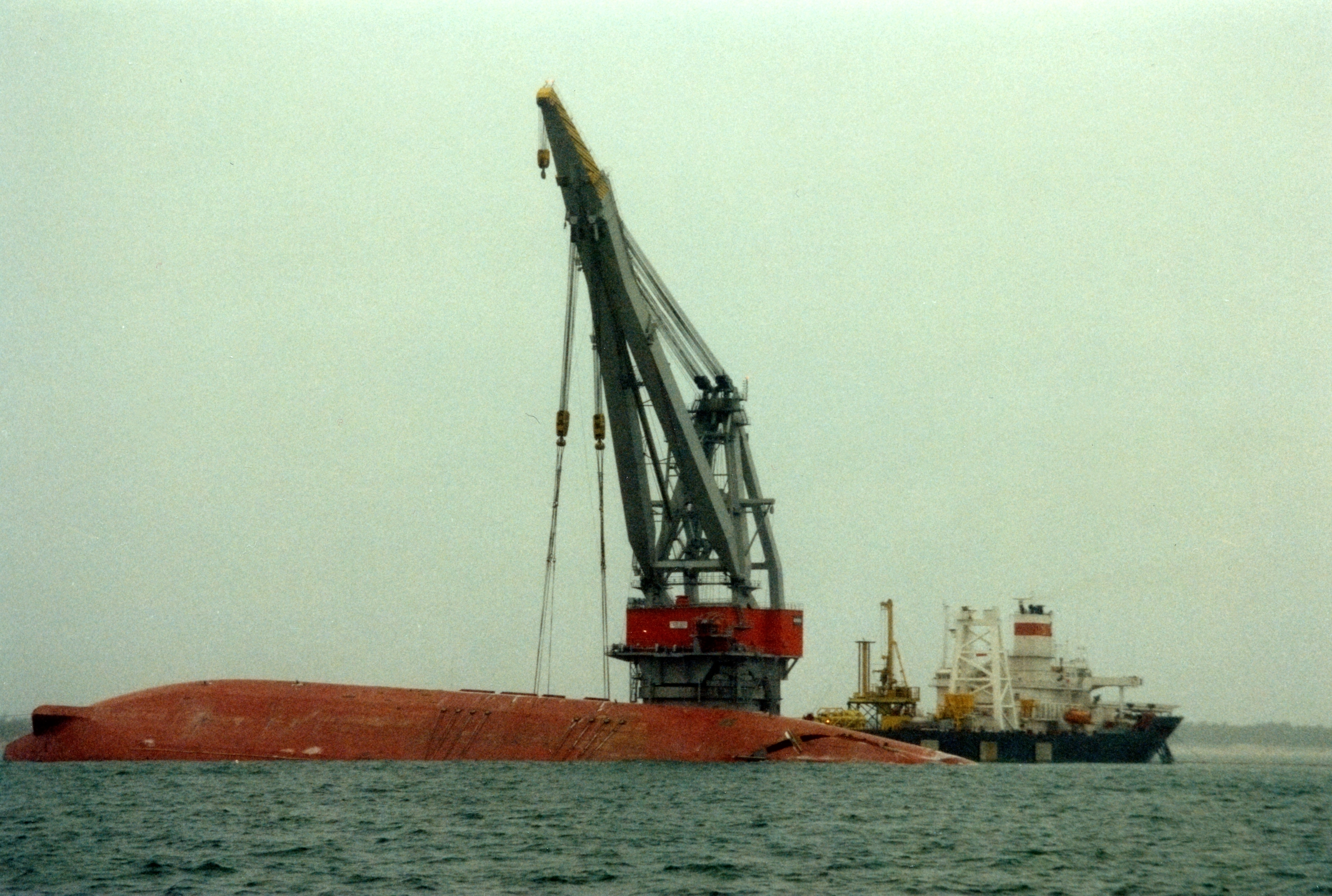
Soviet crane ship Stanislav Yudin rightening the capsized Finn-Baltic on 27 January 1991.

When Finn-Baltic capsized, some heavy fuel oil spilled to the sea and had to be recovered from the nearby shores. After the chief engineer and the chief officer had been rescued, the combination was refloated from the shallows and towed to a sheltered location near Ryssö and Mässkär islands on 9 January 1991 to prevent further oil spills and damage to the vessels due to heavy seas. Finn-Baltic was rightened two months later by a Soviet crane ship Stanislav Yudin. The first two attempts resulted in failures, the first on 28 January due to a severed cable and the second two days later due to insufficient lifting capacity, but the third attempt on 1 February was successful. The damaged vessels were towed to Hollming shipyard in Rauma for rebuilding and returned to service in 1991, the pusher as Steel and the barge as Botnia.

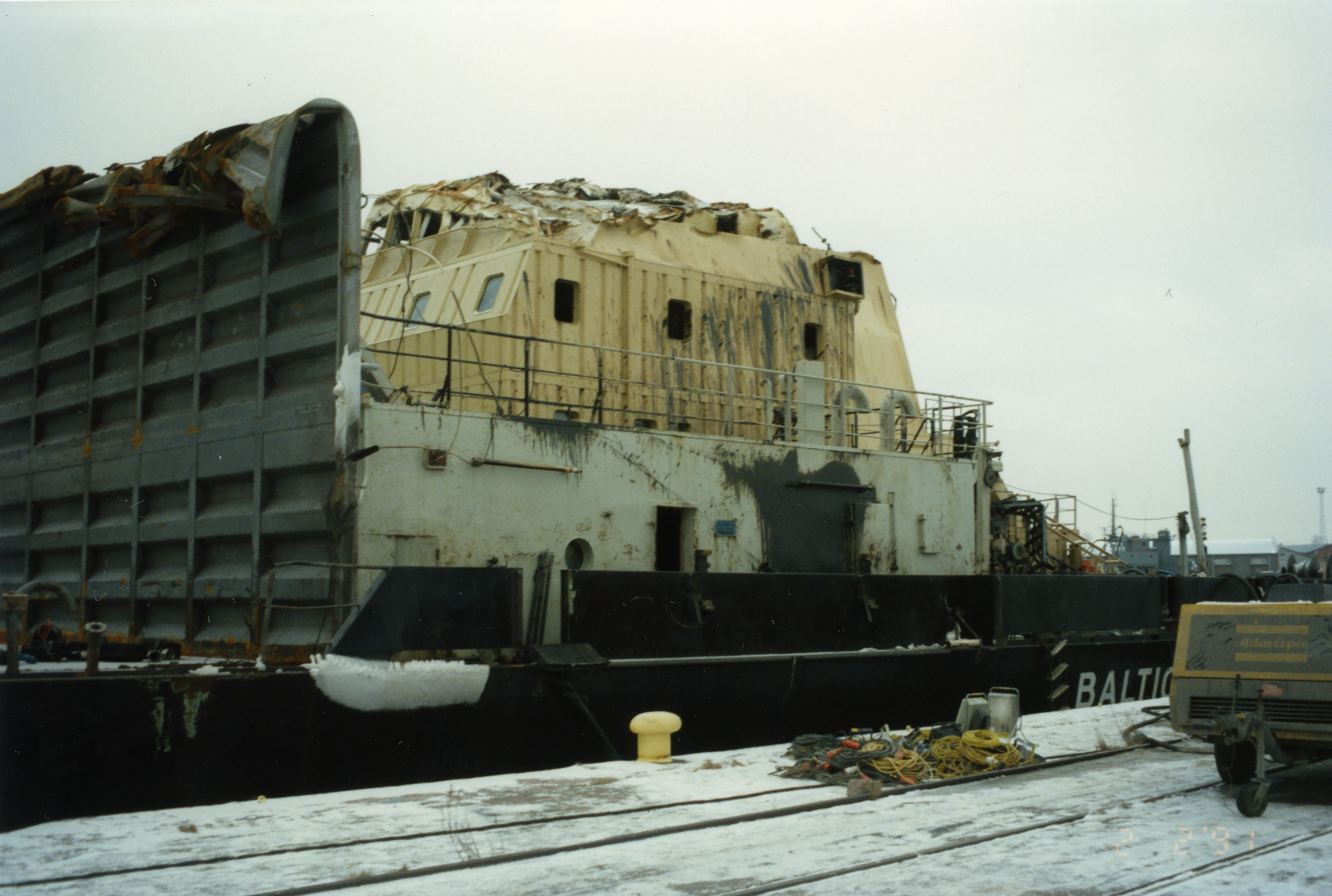
Damaged Finn-Baltic after rightening in Hanko on 2 February 1991.

Both the pusher and the barge suffered extensive damages from the accident. When the cargo shifted, the port side coamings and ramp were cut at the deck level and disappeared to the sea along with the cargo. As Finn-Baltic drifted towards the shallows, the superstructure and smoke stack of the pusher and the remaining parts of the coamings of the barge were crushed and mangled when they came into contact with the seafloor — large parts of the superstructure were later recovered for investigation along the drifting path. Some minor damage was also caused by the rightening operation.

Seven crew members and a pilot from Hanko lost their lives in the accident. Due to the extensive damage suffered by the pusher only two bodies were found and recovered during the initial dives into the capsized vessel in early January — the first engineer was found in the crushed office and the chief steward in the staircase. After the combination had been rightened on 1 February, the purser was found in the shower room of his own cabin and the electrician in a spare cabin next to the mess hall. When the detached parts of the superstructure were recovered for official investigation in late February, the body of the first mate was found in the remains of the machinery room located below the bridge. The search for the missing victims continued until July 1991 mainly by the Finnish Navy and a tourist submarine chartered to the investigation board. The bodies of the captain and the pilot, who were at the bridge when Finn-Baltic capsized, were found along the drifting path in May and June, respectively. The body of the deck repair man was never recovered.

=== Legacy ===
According to the investigation board the capsizing of Finn-Baltic was a direct result of cargo shifting, caused by the bottom layer of the ore concentrate becoming saturated with water and liquefying. When the vessel encountered heavy seas and began to roll, the cargo in the forward part of the hold shifted, resulting in a permanent list of roughly two degrees. When the crew attempted to turn the combination against the wind, a standard procedure in such situation, the remaining cargo moved as a single mass due to the centrifugal force, sliding against the port side coamings and capsizing the vessel.

The accident led to operational changes in loading and shipping of certain types of cargo, namely iron ore concentrates — a wind limit of 14 metres per second (27 kn) was imposed on the Finnpusku system when carrying MAF. Later it was found out that the pusher-barge combinations shipped the iron ore concentrate from Luleå under an exceptional permit from the Finnish Maritime Administration that did not extend to transportations south from Raahe. This resulted in a lengthy legal battle on behalf of the insurance companies and the families of the crew members who lost their lives, and the shipping company had to return the indemnities it had received.

The capsizing of Finn-Baltic remains the worst accident involving the vessels of the Finnpusku system. In 2004 pusher Herakles, which was converted from a salvage tug in 1991, sank along with the barge Bulk laden with coal when the pusher lost both main engines in a storm and subsequently foundered near the Swedish Grundkallen lighthouse. While both vessels of the combination were total losses and the fuel oil from the ruptured tanks polluted Finnish and Swedish coastlines, the crew was successfully evacuated by Finnish and Swedish helicopters. One of the Finnish Border Guard helicopters, OH-HVF, participated in both rescue operations.

The name of the integrated tug barge system, Finnpusku, fell out of official use after the capsizing of Finn.

== Technical details ==
=== General characteristics ===
The overall length of Steel is 41.7 metres (136.8 ft) and its length between perpendiculars is 40.2 metres (131.9 ft). The breadth of the hull is 14.37 metres (47.1 ft) at the waterline, but the maximum breadth of the vessel due to the bridge wings is 15.5 metres (50.9 ft). The draught and depth to the upper deck, 6.7 metres (22.0 ft) and 10 metres (32.8 ft) respectively, are the same as those of a fully laden barge. The displacement of the pusher is 2,230 tons and deadweight tonnage 431 tons, and its gross tonnage is 1,562 and net tonnage 469.

Steel is classified by Det Norske Veritas with a class notation of +1A1 ICE-1A+ Pusher and Pusher/Barge Unit E0. It has the highest Finnish-Swedish ice class, 1A Super, which means that the pusher is designed to operate in difficult ice conditions both alone and when coupled to a barge mainly without icebreaker assistance. While usually connected to a barge, Steel is also capable of operating independently. However, the low metacentric height of the pusher, only 0.5–0.6 m (1.6–2.0 ft), results in large roll amplitudes and pitching, making the vessel very uncomfortable in severe weather. For this reason short transit journeys without a barge are done only when it is absolutely necessary.

The Finnpusku system uses a unique rigid coupling system, Wärtsilä Marine Locomotive, which consists of two hydraulic locking pins, one on each side of the pusher, and one fixed pin in the bow. The pusher can be connected to the barge at three different levels, removing the need to ballast the barge to the same draught as the pusher when not carrying cargo. In addition to mechanical coupling the pusher is connected to the barge by several electrical cables on the starboard side and flexible pipes on the port side. The latter allow the pusher's fuel and freshwater tanks to be topped up from the much larger storage tanks of the barge.

One of the most prominent features of the pusher is the high superstructure rising 22 metres (72 ft) from the waterline. In addition to accommodation, mess and dayroom for the crew of nine, it initially housed two bridges at different levels. The lower bridge on the third deck was originally intended to be used when the pusher is operating on its own without a barge, allowing more comfortable conditions for the crew — the chairs in the upper bridge on the seventh deck were equipped with seatbelts due to the large motions of the vessel when operating independently. However, the lower bridge was rarely used and the space was converted to other uses when Steel was rebuilt. The upper bridge, with bridge wings extending beyond the pusher's breadth, is equipped to allow one man bridge operation.

=== Power and propulsion ===
Propulsion power is provided by two six-cylinder Sulzer 6ZAL40 4-stroke medium-speed diesel engines running on heavy fuel oil, manufactured under licence by Wärtsilä, each with a maximum continuous output of 3,840 kW (5,150 hp) at 380 rpm, giving the combination a service speed of 13.4 knots (24.8 km/h; 15.4 mph). A Lohmann & Stolterfoht reduction gearbox connects the main engines to a propeller shaft driving a 4.7-metre (15 ft) four-bladed Rauma-Repola Liaaen controllable-pitch propeller and a 900 kVa Strömberg shaft generator used to power the bow thruster in the barge. The main engines are equipped with steam-generating exhaust boilers to improve the overall efficiency of the power plant. Electricity is provided by two Wärtsilä-Vasa 4R22HF diesel engines, each producing 590 kW (791 hp) at 1,000 rpm, that are connected to 710 kVa Strömberg alternators. The auxiliary generating sets are mounted side by side above the propeller shaft due to the narrow hull. A 158 kW Volvo Penta TMD102A emergency generator is located on the main deck level in the smoke stack.
