= List of exports of Australia =

Exports of Australia by product category (2019) Chemical products Transportation Machines Mineral products Plastics and rubbers Metals Foodstuffs Precious metals Textiles Instruments Animal products Vegetable products Paper goods Footwear and headwear Miscellaneous Stone and glass Wood products Animal and vegetable bi-products Animal hides Arts and antiques Weapons

The following is a list of the top 20 exports of Australia in 2017-18, as reported by its Department of Foreign Affairs and Trade.

#	Commodity	Value (A$ million)	% share of exports
1	Iron ores & concentrates	61,357	15.2
2	Coal	60,356	15.0
3	Education (Note: Includes education-related travel services, royalties on education services and other education services.)	32,434	8.0
4	Natural gas	30,907	7.7
5	Personal travel (excl education) services	21,580	5.4
6	Gold	19,293	4.8
7	Aluminium ores & concentrates (incl alumina)	9,448	2.3
8	Beef	7,963	2.0
9	Petroleum	6,507	1.6
10	Copper ores & concentrates	5,720	1.4
11	Professional services	4,211	1.3
12	Wheat	4,652	1.2
13	Financial services	4,574	1.1
14	Meat (excl beef)	4,526	1.1
15	Technical & other business services	4,262	1.1
16	Telecom, computer & information services	4,173	1.0
17	Aluminium	4,097	1.0
18	Wool & other animal hair (incl tops)	3,985	1.0
19	Other ores & concentrates (Note: Mainly of lead, zinc and manganese.)	3,141	0.8
20	Alcoholic beverages	3,111	0.8
