= Grundkallen =

Grundkallen Lighthouse
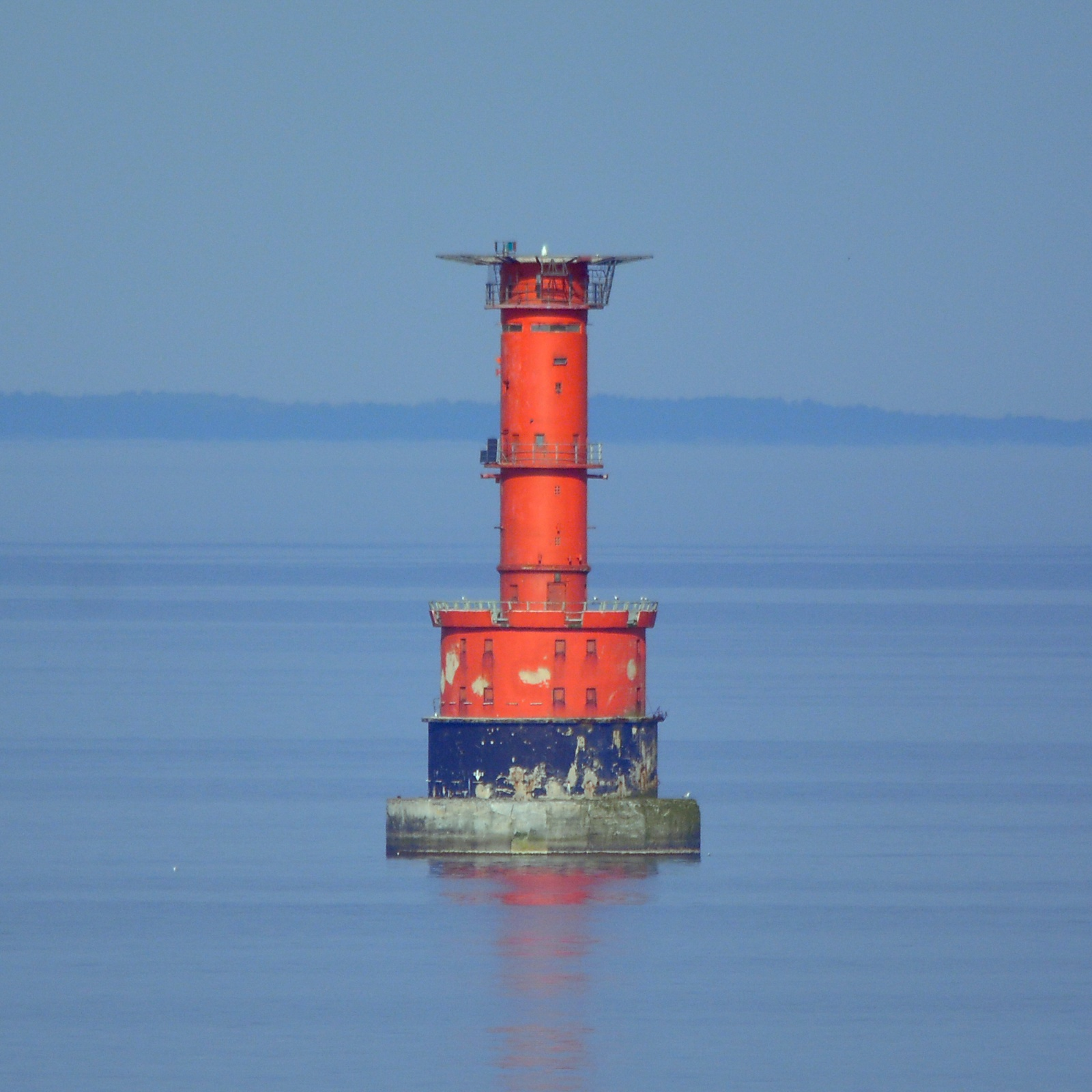
- Grundkallen Lighthouse
- Location: 20 km (12 mi) northeast of Öregrund; Sweden
- Coordinates: 60°29′43″N 18°50′59″E

Tower
- Constructed: 1961
- Foundation: concrete
- Construction: concrete tower
- Automated: 1 January 1980
- Height: 34 m (111.5 ft)
- Shape: cylindrical tower with double balcony and lantern on a 2-storey crew quarters, helipad on the top
- Markings: red tower, black basement
- Power source: diesel generator, solar cell panel
- Operator: Swedish Maritime Administration (Sjöfartsverket)
- Racon: G

Light
- Focal height: 32 m (105.0 ft)
- Lens: sixth order Fresnel lens (1992–)
- Range: 9.2 nmi (17.0 km; 10.6 mi) (white), 6.6 nmi (12.2 km; 7.6 mi) (red), 5.6 nmi (10.4 km; 6.4 mi) (green)
- Characteristic: LFl (3) WRG 20s.
- Sweden no.: SV-2187

Grundkallen is a Swedish lighthouse on a shallow of the same name in the southern part of the Gulf of Bothnia, some 20 kilometres (12 miles) northeast of Öregrund. The current 34-metre (111.5 ft) lighthouse was built in 1961 to replace a lightship in the same location. It is a round concrete tower with a helipad on top and a round two-storey crew quarters in the bottom, both painted red, mounted on a round caisson which is painted black. The lighthouse, owned by the Swedish Maritime Administration, is automated and unmanned.

== The wreck of Herakles-Bulk ==
On 3 March 2004 at around 00:30 (UTC+02) a Finnish pusher-barge combination Herakles-Bulk sank near the Grundkallen lighthouse. The combination had left Oxelösund two days earlier and was heading north with the barge fully laden with coal. On 2 March she ran into a storm and the captain, not certain if the vessel could be safely turned around in such conditions to seek shelter closer to the coast, decided to evacuate half of the crew by helicopter. When the port engine began overheating and later the starboard engine lost all power, the combination was no longer able to keep the bow into the wind and began to drift uncontrollably in the storm. The remaining crew was soon evacuated and shortly afterwards Herakles-Bulk collided with the lighthouse, causing superficial damage, and foundered in the nearby shallows.

The 159-metre barge broke in two and an approximately 95 metres long section settled in the bottom on an even keel only tens of metres from the lighthouse. Part of the side structure and a ramp protrude above the surface. Another section, approximately 60 metres long, is located about 300 metres south-southeast from the lighthouse, with the forecastle of the barge protruding in an oblique angle above the surface. The wrecks do not pose a hazard to navigation.

== See also ==
- List of lighthouses and lightvessels in Sweden
