= Rautaruukki (pusher) =

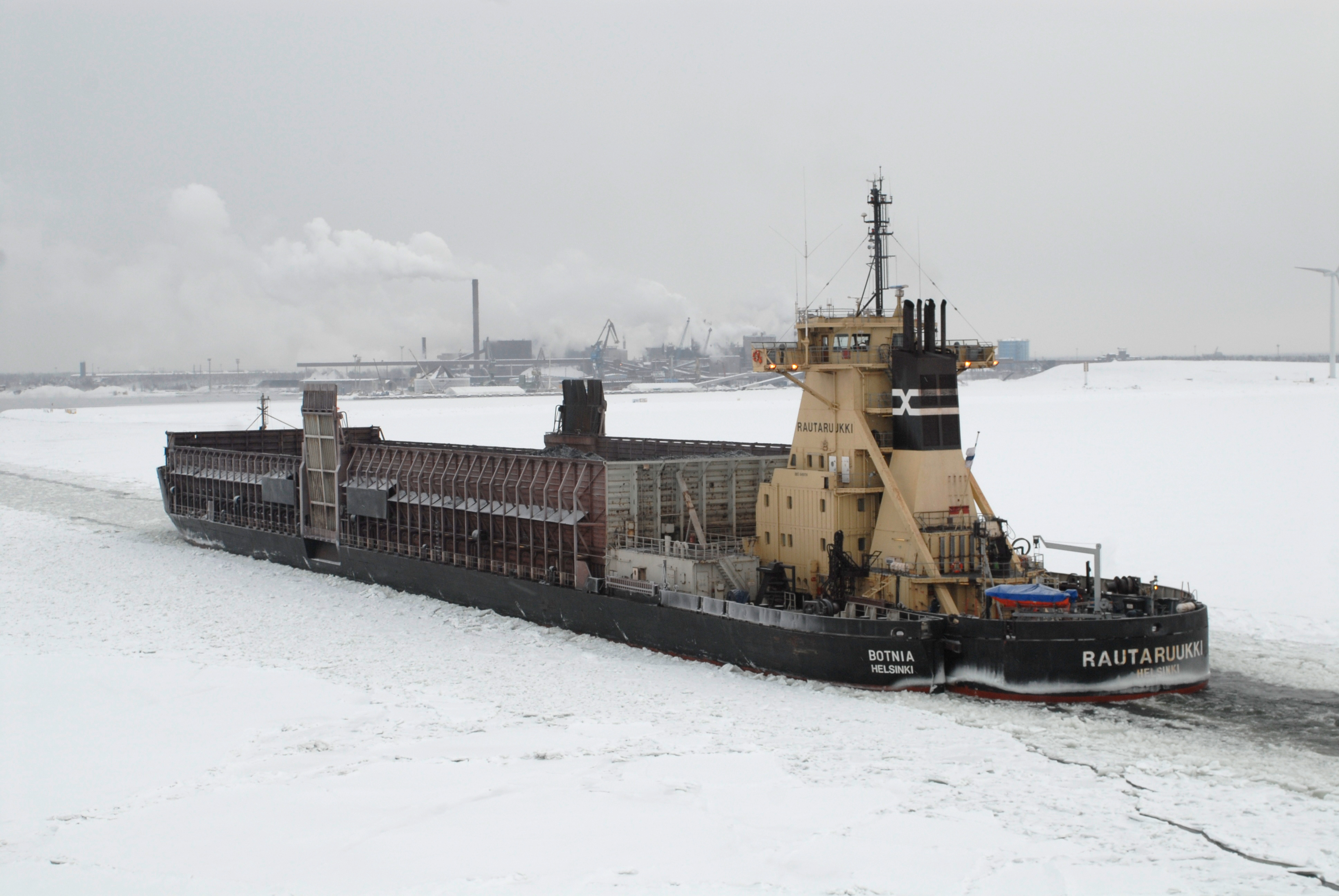
- Rautaruukki and Botnia outside Raahe, Finland, with the Raahe Steel Works in the background.

History
- Name: Rautaruukki
- Owner: 1986–1996: Rautaruukki Oy; 1996–2003: Merita Rahoitus Oy; 2003–present: ESL Shipping Ltd
- Operator: 1986–2003: Oy Finnlines Ltd; 2003–present: ESL Shipping Ltd
- Port of registry: 1986–1989: Raahe, Finland; 1989–1996: Stockholm, Sweden; 1996–present: Helsinki, Finland
- Ordered: 29 September 1984
- Builder: Hollming Oy, Rauma, Finland
- Yard number: 262
- Laid down: 27 June 1985
- Launched: 20 December 1985
- Completed: 31 October 1986
- Identification: IMO number: 8418174; Call sign: 1986–1989: OITU; 1996–: OJHM; MMSI number: 230358000
- Status: In service

General characteristics
- Type: Pusher
- Tonnage: 1,554 GT; 466 NT; 445 DWT
- Displacement: 2,230 tons
- Length: 41.7 m (136.8 ft) (overall)
- Beam: 14.37 m (47.1 ft) (waterline); 15.5 m (50.85 ft) (bridge wings)
- Draught: 6.7 m (22.0 ft)
- Depth: 10.0 m (32.8 ft)
- Ice class: 1A Super
- Installed power: 2 × Wärtsilä-Sulzer 6ZAL40 (2 × 3,840 kW)
- Propulsion: Single shaft; 4.7 m (15.4 ft) variable pitch propeller; Bow thruster (680 kW)
- Speed: 13.4 knots (24.8 km/h; 15.4 mph)
- Crew: 9

Rautaruukki is a Finnish pusher vessel owned and operated by ESL Shipping. It is part of the Finnpusku integrated tug and barge system developed in the 1980s by Finnlines, a Finnish shipping company that also managed the vessel until 2003, in co-operation with Rautaruukki for the transportation needs of the steel company. Rautaruukki, built by Hollming in Rauma, Finland, was delivered on 30 October 1986 and has since been used mainly to supply raw materials to the Raahe Steel Works.

Rautaruukki has an identical sister vessel, Steel, which was delivered in 1987 as Finn. The vessel capsized in 1990, but was rebuilt, renamed and returned to service in 1991.

== Development and construction ==
The development of the Finnpusku system dates back to the 1960s when Finnlines developed the first version of the icegoing pusher-barge system. While the concept was not pursued further due to various problems, an upgraded version was developed in the 1970s. In the late 1970s Rautaruukki Oy began transporting raw materials to the steel mill in Raahe by towed barges and found them suitable for the steel company's transportation needs. However, due to the poor maneuverability of the barges and their inability to operate in winter conditions, Rautaruukki decided to investigate if it would be possible to design a pusher-barge system that could also be operated in ice conditions. When Finnlines was consulted, it presented the Finnpusku system it had developed, and the two companies signed a development contract. Later Finnlines performed several feasibility studies which showed that a pusher-barge system would be the most economical and efficient method of transporting bulk cargoes on the relatively short routes of the Baltic Sea.

The initial plan was to establish shipping companies for each vessel of the Finnpusku system under the joint ownership of several large Finnish industrial and shipping companies, including Rautaruukki and Finnlines, which would also manage the vessels. However, due to delays in negotiations Rautaruukki, concerned about the continuous supply of raw materials to the Raahe Steel Works, decided to order one pusher and two barges for itself and signed a building contract with Hollming on 29 September 1984. The first pusher of the Finnpusku system, Rautaruukki, was laid down on 27 June and launched on 20 December 1985.

Pusher Rautaruukki and barges Kalla and Tasku, built by a Portuguese shipyard Estaleiros Navais de Setubal in Setúbal and outfitted in Rauma, were delivered to Rautaruukki on 31 October 1986. When the two pushers and five barges of the Finnpusku system entered service in 1986–1987, it was estimated that they would carry one third of the ten million tons of bulk cargo arriving in Finland by sea every year.

== Career ==
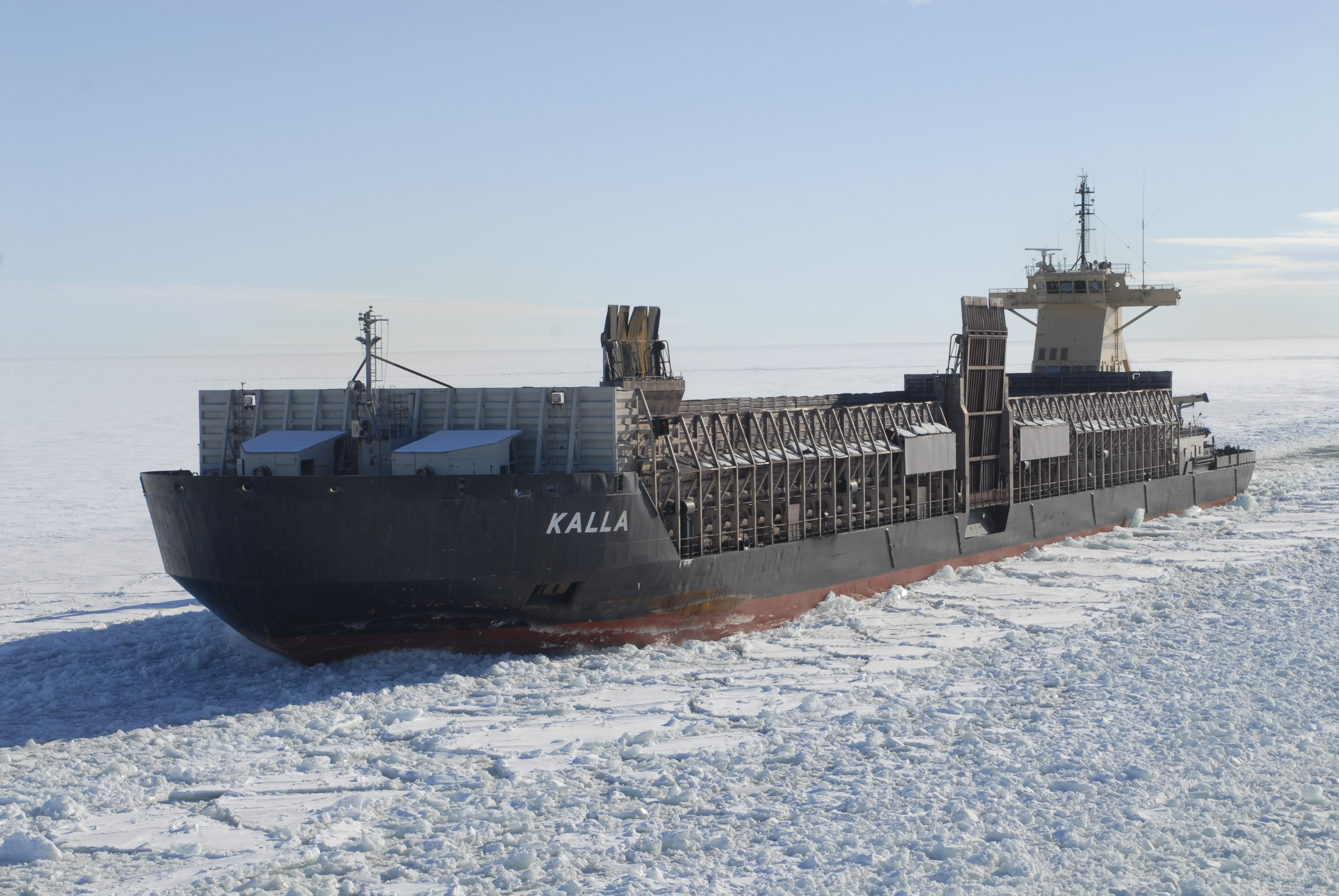
Rautaruukki and Kalla outside Luleå, Sweden.

While the jointly owned pusher Finn was time-chartered by the transportation department of Rautaruukki only when the steel company required additional capacity, Rautaruukki was used since the beginning solely to supply the Raahe Steel Works with raw materials. The pusher-barge combinations transported different bulk cargoes from various ports of the Baltic Sea, such as limestone from the port of Storugns in Gotland, iron ore concentrate from Luleå, Sweden, and coal from various Eastern European ports.

After initial issues were solved, the Finnpusku system was found out to be suitable for the transportation needs of Rautaruukki in both port-to-port transport and lightening large bulk carriers outside the port of Raahe. By the end of 1987 the amount of cargo transported by the Finnpusku system, 7.5 million tons per year, had grown beyond the capability of the transportation department that was under the central administration of the steel company, so on 1 May 1988 a subsidiary company, JIT-Trans, was established to deal with both the parent company's own cargoes and external shipping business.

In 1989, JIT-Trans signed a long-term contract with SSAB for the transportation of iron ore concentrate and pellets from Luleå to Oxelösund. Since Finland and Sweden had no reciprocity agreement for cabotage, part of the Finnpusku system had to be transferred to the Swedish Register of Ships. Rautaruukki sold pusher Rautaruukki and barges Kalla and Tasku to new joint shipping companies formed by the Finnish companies' Swedish subsidiaries. Despite the changes in ownership and flag Finnlines retained the management of the vessels through its Swedish subsidiary.

Rautaruukki returned under the Finnish flag in 1996 after the ownership was transferred to a Finnish financial institution Merita Rahoitus (nowadays known as Nordea Rahoitus).

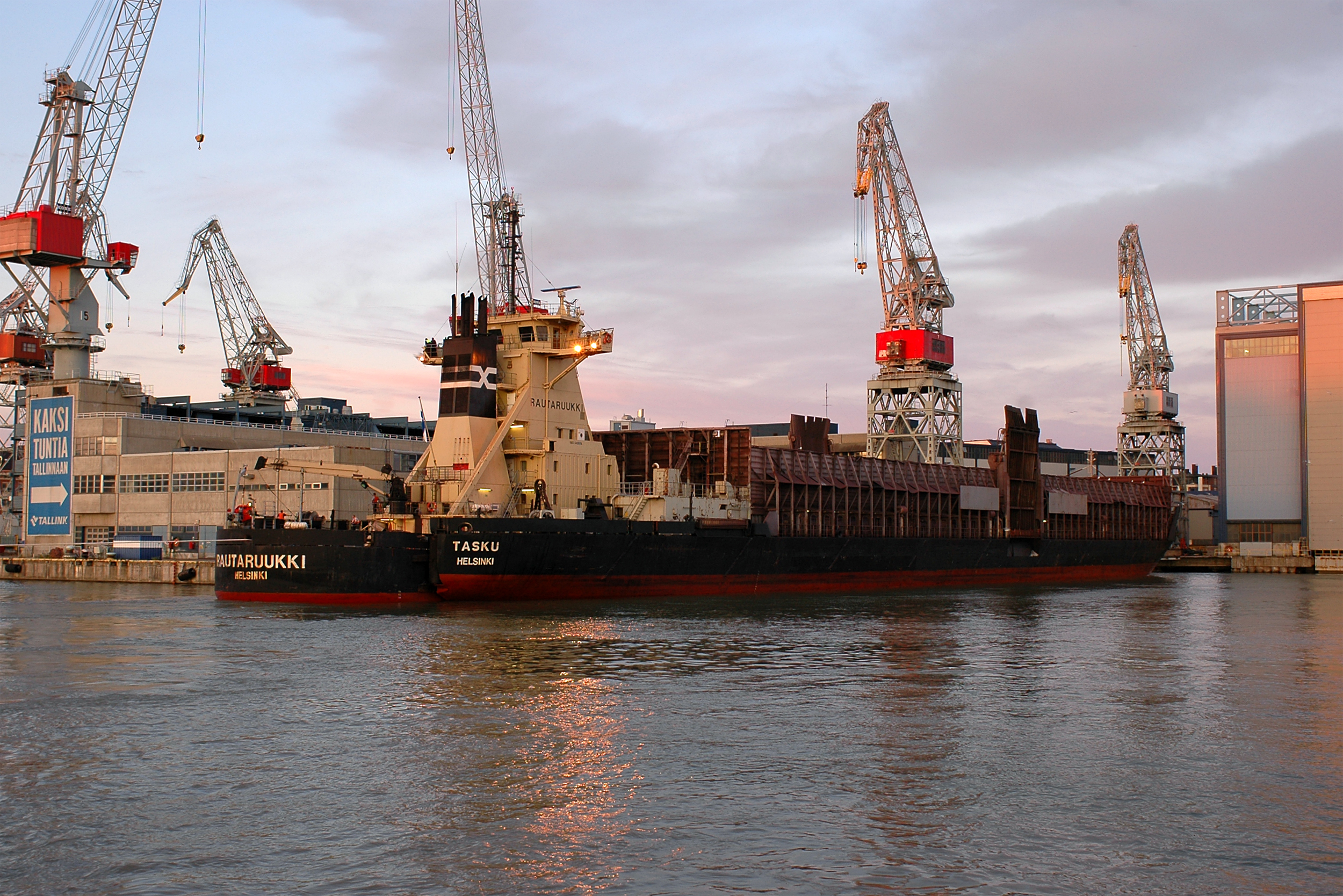
Rautaruukki and Tasku at Arctech Helsinki Shipyard on 26 June 2011.

In July 2003 a seven-year contract for the transportation of raw materials in the Baltic Sea was signed between JIT-Trans and Aspo Group. As part of the agreement, worth 140 million euros, the ownership and management of the Finnpusku system was transferred to ESL Shipping, a subsidiary of the Aspo Group. In February 2011 ESL Shipping signed a new long-term contract with Rautaruukki for the transportation of the raw materials of the steel industry in the Baltic Sea. The pushers and barges of the Finnpusku system were docked at Arctech Helsinki Shipyard and modernized by STX Finland Lifecycle Services during the summer of 2011. Rautaruukki arrived at Helsinki for modernization in late June and left in early August.

Unlike the other pushers of the Finnpusku system, Rautaruukki has not been involved in a severe accident. Its sister vessel, Finn, capsized with the barge Baltic in 1990 with a loss of eight lives and Herakles, a salvage tug converted to a pusher in 1991, sank with the barge Bulk in 2004.

== Technical details ==
=== General characteristics ===
The overall length of Rautaruukki is 41.7 metres (136.8 ft) and its length between perpendiculars is 40.2 metres (131.9 ft). The breadth of the hull is 14.37 metres (47.1 ft) at the waterline, but the maximum breadth of the vessel due to the bridge wings is 15.5 metres (50.9 ft). The draught and depth to the upper deck, 6.7 metres (22.0 ft) and 10 metres (32.8 ft) respectively, are the same as those of a fully laden barge. The displacement of the pusher is 2,230 tons and deadweight tonnage 445 tons, and its gross tonnage is 1,554 and net tonnage 446.

Rautaruukki is classified by Det Norske Veritas with a class notation of +1A1 ICE-1A+ Pusher and Pusher/Barge Unit E0. It has the highest Finnish-Swedish ice class, 1A Super, which means that the pusher is designed to operate in difficult ice conditions both alone and when coupled to a barge mainly without icebreaker assistance. While usually connected to a barge, Rautaruukki is also capable of operating independently. However, the low metacentric height of the pusher, only 0.5–0.6 m (1.6–2.0 ft), results in large roll amplitudes and pitching, making the vessel very uncomfortable in severe weather. For this reason short transit journeys without a barge are done only when it is absolutely necessary.

The Finnpusku system uses a unique rigid coupling system, Wärtsilä Marine Locomotive, which consists of two hydraulic locking pins, one on each side of the pusher, and one fixed pin in the bow. The pusher can be connected to the barge at three different levels, removing the need to ballast the barge to the same draught as the pusher when not carrying cargo. In addition to mechanical coupling the pusher is connected to the barge by several electrical cables on the starboard side and flexible pipes on the port side. The latter allow the pusher's fuel and freshwater tanks to be topped up from the much larger storage tanks of the barge.

One of the most prominent features of the pusher is the high superstructure rising 22 metres (72 ft) from the waterline. In addition to accommodation, mess and dayroom for the crew of nine, it initially housed two bridges at different levels. The lower bridge on the third deck was originally intended to be used when the pusher is operating on its own without a barge, allowing more comfortable conditions for the crew — the chairs in the upper bridge on the seventh deck were equipped with seatbelts due to the large motions of the vessel when operating independently. However, the lower bridge was rarely used, and the space was later converted to an office. The upper bridge, with bridge wings extending beyond the pusher's breadth, is equipped to allow one man bridge operation.

=== Power and propulsion ===
Propulsion power is provided by two six-cylinder Sulzer 6ZAL40 4-stroke medium-speed diesel engines running on heavy fuel oil, manufactured under licence by Wärtsilä, each with a maximum continuous output of 3,840 kW (5,150 hp) at 380 rpm, giving the combination a service speed of 13.4 knots (24.8 km/h; 15.4 mph). A Lohmann & Stolterfoht reduction gearbox connects the main engines to a propeller shaft driving a 4.7-metre (15.4 ft) four-bladed Rauma-Repola Liaaen controllable-pitch propeller and a 900 kVa Strömberg shaft generator used to power the bow thruster in the barge. The main engines are equipped with steam-generating exhaust boilers to improve the overall efficiency of the power plant. Electricity is provided by two Wärtsilä-Vasa 4R22HF diesel engines, each producing 590 kW (791 hp) at 1,000 rpm, that are connected to 710 kVa Strömberg alternators. The auxiliary generating sets are mounted side by side above the propeller shaft due to the narrow hull. A 158 kW Volvo Penta TMD102A emergency generator is located on the main deck level in the smokestack.
