= Finnish–Swedish ice class =

Ice class assigned to a vessel operating in first-year ice in the Baltic Sea

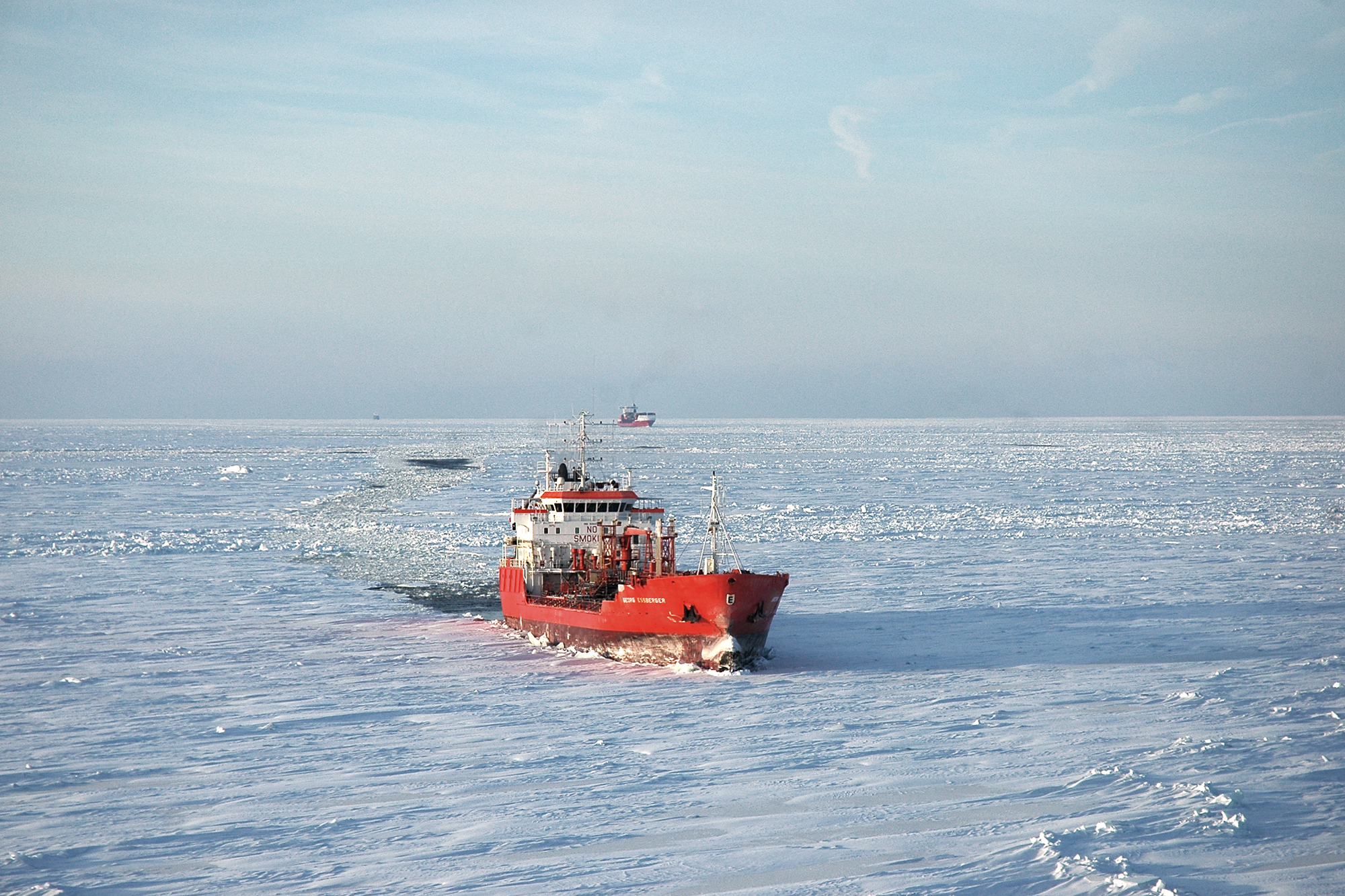
Product tanker Georg Essberger waiting for icebreaker assistance outside Loviisa in the Gulf of Finland. Its ice class, 1A, fulfilled the minimum requirements of the traffic restrictions at that time and the ship was escorted to port.

Finnish–Swedish ice class is an ice class assigned to a vessel operating in first-year ice in the Baltic Sea and calling at Finnish or Swedish ports. Ships are divided into six ice classes based on requirements for hull structural design, engine output and performance in ice according to the regulations issued by the Finnish Transport and Communications Agency (Traficom) and the Swedish Maritime Administration.

== Purpose ==
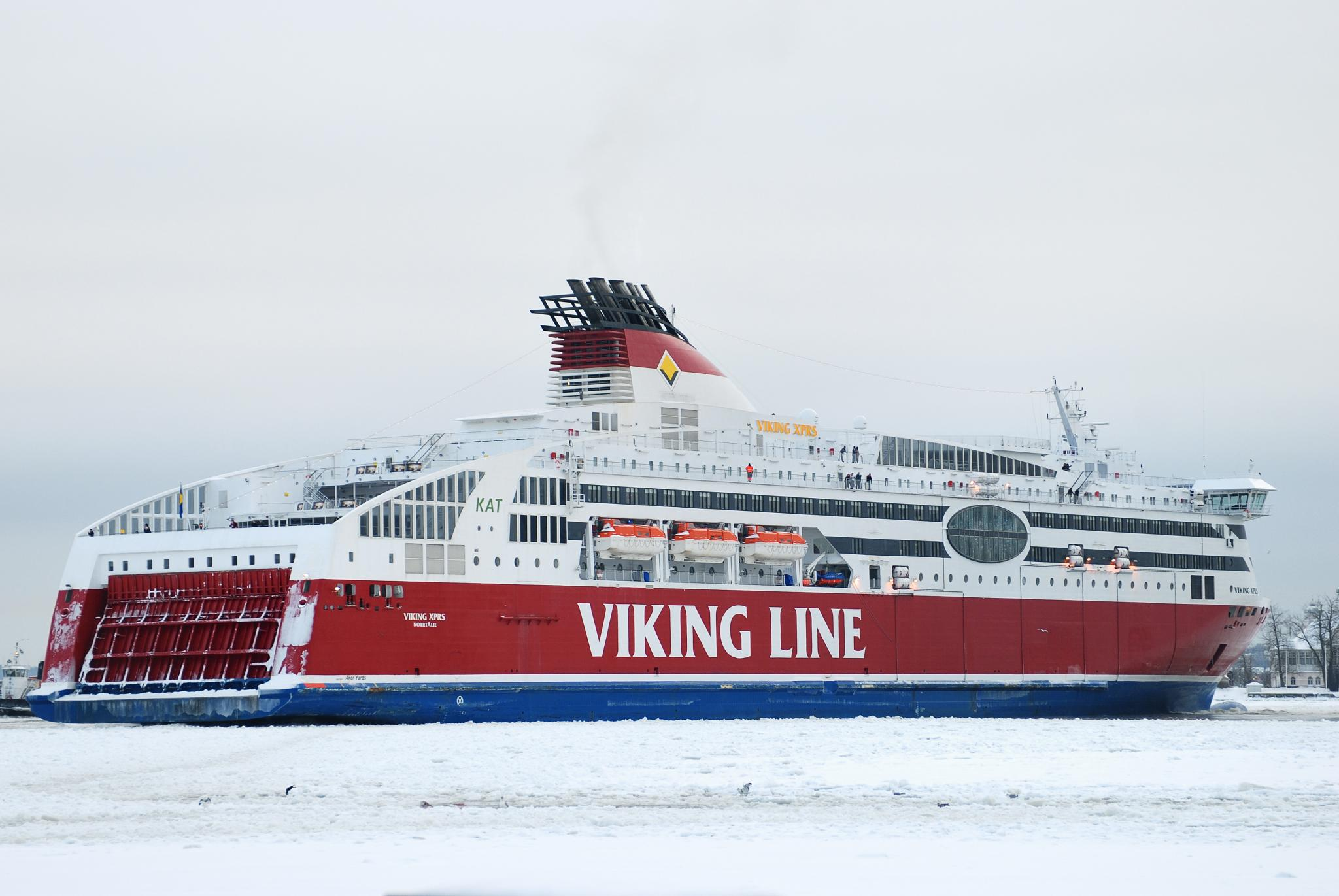
Cruiseferries sailing on regular routes between Finland, Sweden and Estonia are usually built to the highest Finnish–Swedish ice class, 1A Super. Due to their high engine power, the cruiseferries do not normally require icebreaker assistance.

During the winter months, Finnish and Swedish authorities may declare traffic restrictions in the Northern Baltic Sea in order to ensure that ships operating in the region are capable of navigating in ice-covered waters safely and efficiently. These restrictions, for example "ice class 1A, 2000 DWT", declare the minimum ice class and other requirements for ships that may be provided with icebreaker assistance. The Finnish fairway dues, a system of fees charged for using sea lanes to cover the costs of management and icebreaker assistance, also depend on the vessels' ice class. Since ships of lower ice classes generally require more assistance during the winter months, their fairway dues are considerably higher than those of ships of the highest ice classes. For this reason the majority of ships regularly calling Finnish ports are built to higher ice classes.

Many international classification societies have incorporated the Finnish–Swedish ice class rules into their rulebooks and offer ice class notations recognized by the Finnish and Swedish authorities. These ice classes are, in turn, used by countries such as Estonia and Latvia to assign traffic restrictions. Since the ice class rules have been revised and amended several times over the years, a list of equivalent ice class notations is used to assign the correct official ice class for older vessels when they visit Finnish and Swedish ports. Although mainly used in the Baltic Sea, the Finnish–Swedish ice classes and the equivalent ice class notations from classification societies are sometimes used when discussing ships operating in other freezing seas of the world.

While the Finnish–Swedish ice classes can be assigned to icebreakers to enable collecting fairway dues, the rules for design and construction are intended for merchant ships operating under icebreaker escort. Because the engine output and the level of ice-strengthening in ships designed to operate independently in ice-infested waters, especially in the presence of multi-year ice, usually exceeds the requirements of the Finnish–Swedish ice class rules, the classification societies use different ice class notations, such as the IACS Polar Class, for icebreakers. The two highest Finnish–Swedish ice classes, 1A and 1A Super, are somewhat equivalent to the two lowest Polar Classes, PC 7 and PC 6, respectively.

== Definition and requirements ==
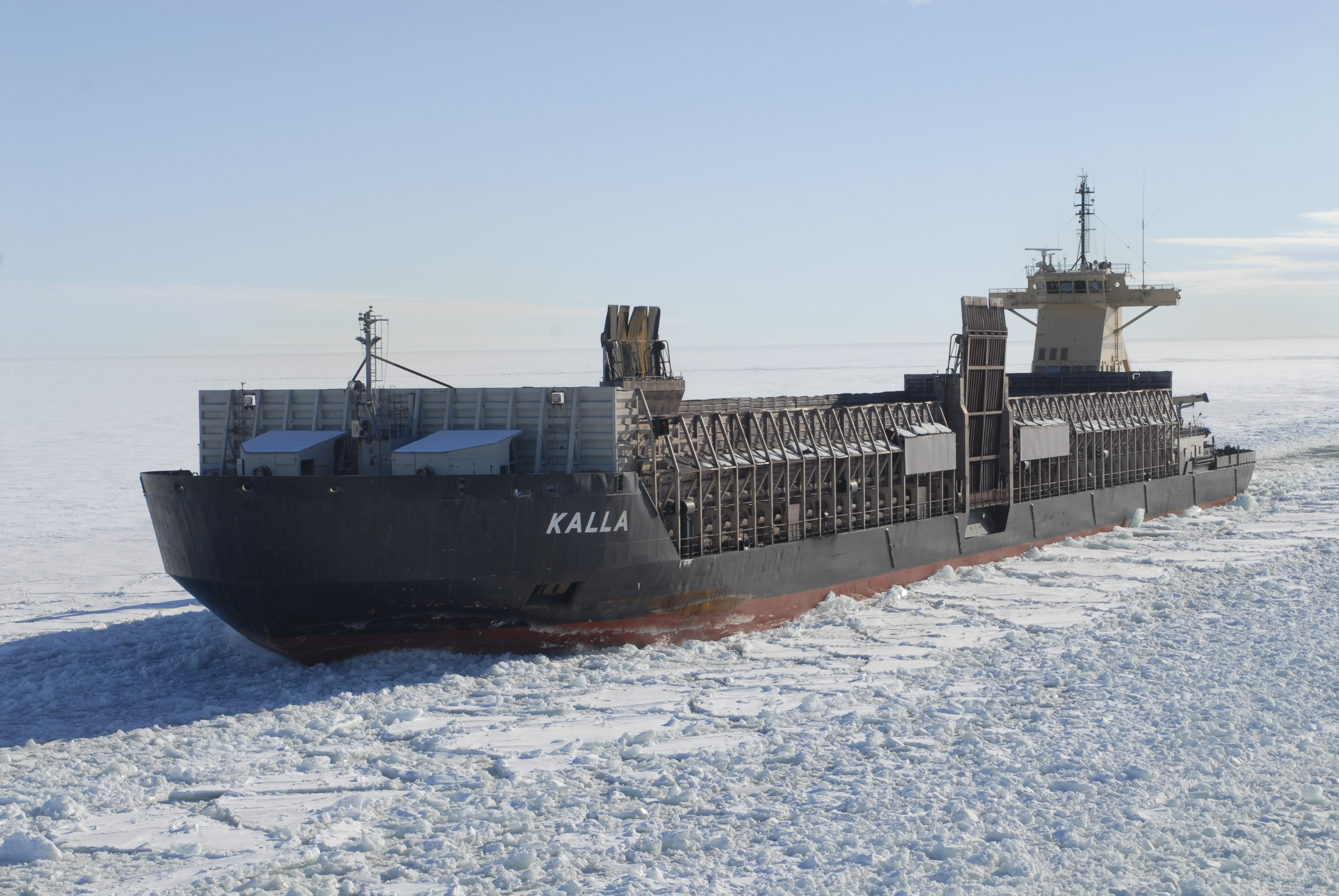
When operating alone, pusher Rautaruukki has the same ice class as the integrated tug and barge, 1A Super, but the unpropelled Kalla is downgraded to ice class 3.

Ships of the highest Finnish–Swedish ice class, 1A Super, are designed to operate in difficult ice conditions mainly without icebreaker assistance while ships of lower ice classes 1A, 1B and 1C are assumed to rely on icebreaker assistance. However, even ships of the highest ice class are assumed to require icebreaker assistance from time to time. In addition there are ice class 2 for self-propelled steel-hulled ships with no ice strengthening that are capable of operating independently in very light ice conditions and ice class 3 for vessels that do not belong to any other class such as unpropelled barges and ships built of wood. The Finnish–Swedish ice classes are usually spelled with Roman numerals, e.g. IA, in official context and legislation.

Ships must fulfill certain design requirements in order to obtain the ice class from the Finnish and Swedish authorities. The design requirement for ice class 1A Super is a minimum speed of 5 knots in a broken brash ice channel with a thickness of 1.0 metre (3.3 ft) in the middle and a consolidated (refrozen) ice layer of 0.1 metres (3.9 in). Ice classes 1A, 1B and 1C have lower design requirements corresponding to non-consolidated ice channels with a thickness of 1.0, 0.8 and 0.6 metres (3.3, 2.6 and 2.0 ft) in the middle, respectively. While the ice class rules provide equations to calculate the minimum engine power based on the ship's main dimensions and hull shape, more exact calculations or ice model tests resulting in lower minimum engine power can also be approved, but in such case the ice class can be revoked if the experience of the ship's performance in practice motivates this.

In addition, the strength of the ship's hull, propulsion system and steering gear must be adequate to allow safe operation in the presence of ice, and the rules provide tables and formulas to determine minimum scantlings and other design criteria for each ice class. The thickness of ice used as the basis of these calculations is sometimes mistaken for the minimum icebreaking capability requirement for the ice-classed vessel.

== History ==
=== Finnish ice class rules (1890–1971) ===
The first Finnish statutory regulation for ships navigating in ice was given on 27 March 1890. It was primarily intended to increase the safety and set a number of requirements for passenger ships operating regularly in winter conditions. These included double bottom in way of the engines and boilers, construction according to the rules of Lloyd's Register or Bureau Veritas, at least five transverse watertight bulkheads, and sufficient damage stability to survive the flooding of two compartments without sinking. The last requirement is interesting because it was not included in the latter ice class rules and did not become mandatory again for ships partaking in international traffic until 1960.

The first Finnish ice class rules that included the fairway dues were published in 1920. According to the rules the ships were to pay "ice fees" according to their net register tonnage, classification and strengthening for navigation in ice during the winter season, which began on 1 December and ended on 16 April in the Gulf of Finland and in the Bothnian Sea, and from 1 November until 1 May in the northern parts of the Gulf of Bothnia. In 1923 a circular about the classification of ice-strengthened ships was sent to the largest classification societies. The ice strengthening of the hull was defined as a percentage that was added to the minimum requirements set by the classification societies, such as 45% increase in shell plating thickness.

The Finnish ice class rules published in 1932 introduced the ice classes 1A, 1B and 1C for ships strengthened for navigation in ice, ice class 2 for ships classified for unrestricted service but not strengthened for navigation in ice and ice class 3 for other vessels. Ice class 2 was further divided to two subclasses, 2A and 2B, and vessels were eligible for the former if they had a radio. Detailed minimum requirements, again as an additional percentage of the open water requirement, were given for the stem, shell plating at the waterline, stiffeners, rudder and rudder bearings, and the propulsion machinery. In the lowest ice class, 1C, the requirements were limited to the bow of the vessel.

The Finnish ice class rules of 1960 included only minor modifications to the existing rules. The subdivision of ice class 2 was abolished as radios had become more common.

In the 1960s the expansion of the Finnish icebreaker fleet allowed navigation in more severe ice conditions, and the Finnish ice class rules published in 1965 introduced a new ice class, 1A Super, which was considerably stronger than the existing classes. Since ice class 1A was already exempted from the ice fees, the 50% reduction to lighthouse fees was given to ships of the new ice class. However, the additional requirements of the highest ice class were deemed excessive and only three such ships were built.

=== Finnish–Swedish ice class rules (1971–) ===
In 1970 a workgroup consisting of the Finnish Maritime Administration, Wärtsilä Helsinki Shipyard and the association of the Finnish shipowners began working on the new ice class rules in close co-operation with major classification societies. Shortly after the work started the Swedish Maritime Administration joined and the new regulations, published in 1971, became known as the Finnish–Swedish ice class rules. According to the new rules the requirements for a ship with ice class 1A, deadweight tonnage of 3,500 tons and engine output of 1,500 hp were kept largely the same, but the requirements for ships of the lowest ice class, 1C, were increased considerably as in the past such ships had been essentially open-water vessels with a strengthened bow. The minimum requirements for the highest ice class, 1A Super, were lowered to make the ships more attractive to shipowners and the requirements for ships with deadweight tonnage below 3,500 tons were increased in all classes to steer shipowners towards bigger vessels that were deemed better for navigation in ice.

However, the biggest change to the previous Finnish ice class rules was the way the structural requirements were determined. Instead of percentages and experience the minimum requirements were based on plastic deformation theory and pressure loads determined from observations of past ice damages in the Baltic Sea. The ships were divided into three areas (bow, midship, aft) and the pressure loads were calculated for each area as a function of the ship's displacement and engine output. The rules regarding rudders, engines and the propulsion system were also changed accordingly, and the propulsion system was to be designed so that its strength increased towards the engine. This minimized the repair costs as the parts most likely to break, the propeller blades, were also the easiest and cheapest to replace. Furthermore, a minimum power requirement was given so that the ice-strengthened ships would be powerful enough to follow the icebreakers and not slow down the traffic.

The Finnish–Swedish ice class rules of 1985 introduced changes to the hull dimensioning. The plastic deformation theory used in the previous rules was changed to elastic, and the load height was changed to more realistic. The minimum engine power requirements were changed in 2002 to correspond to the resistance of the ship in a brash ice channel, calculated as a function of ship size and hull geometry. The rules were revised also in 2002, 2008, 2010, and 2017.

The current Finnish–Swedish ice class rules were issued in 2021 and are applicable to ships contracted for construction on or after 5 July 2021. Older ships are generally required to follow either 1971, 1985, 2002, 2008, 2010, or 2017 ice class regulations depending on their contracting or keel laying date. However, minimum requirement for engine power will become retroactively applicable to ships of ice classes 1A and 1A Super laid down before 1 September 2003 latest at the beginning of the year when 20 years have passed from the delivery of the vessel and ships failing to meet the requirements will have their ice class downgraded.

== See also ==
- Polar Class, a separate set of ice classes maintained by the International Association of Classification Societies (IACS)
