= List of ship launches in 1981 =

The list of ship launches in 1981 includes a chronological list of all ships launched in 1981.

Date	Ship	Class / type	Builder	Location	Country	Notes
28 January	Frankfurt Express	Container ship	Howaldtswerke-Deutsche Werft	Kiel	West Germany	For Hapag-Lloyd
6 February	Lev Tolstoy	Dmitriy Shostakovich-class ferry	Stocznia Szczecinska im Adolfa Warskiego Warskiego	Szczecin	Poland	For Black Sea Shipping Company.
7 February	Mahlon S. Tisdale	Oliver Hazard Perry-class frigate	Todd Pacific Shipyards	San Pedro, California	United States	For United States Navy.
10 February	Setoshio	Yūshio-class submarine			Japan	For Japanese Navy.
6 March	City of Oxford	Container ship	Appledore Shipbuilders Ltd.	Appledore	United Kingdom	For Ellerman Lines Ltd.
9 March	Arromanches	Landing craft	Brooke Marine Ltd.	Lowestoft	United Kingdom	For British Army.
20 March	Harbel Tapper	Bulk carrier	Koyo Dockyard	Mihara, Japan	Japan	
21 March	Houston	Los Angeles-class submarine	Newport News Shipbuilding	Newport News, Virginia	United States	For United States Navy.
21 March	Isomeria	LPG carrier	Harland & Wolff	Belfast	United Kingdom	For Shell Tankers Ltd.
28 March	Almirante Brown	Almirante Brown-class destroyer	Blohm + Voss	Hamburg	West Germany	For Argentine Navy.
4 April	Stephen W. Groves	Oliver Hazard Perry-class frigate	Bath Iron Works	Bath, Maine	United States	For United States Navy.
14 April	Trident	Patrol boat	Brooke Marine Ltd.	Lowestoft	United Kingdom	For Barbados Defence Force.
17 April	Konstantin Simonov	Dmitriy Shostakovich-class ferry	Stocznia Szczecinska im Adolfa Warskiego Warskiego	Szczecin	Poland	For Baltic Sea Shipping Company.
25 April	City of Corpus Christi	Los Angeles-class submarine	Electric Boat	Groton, Connecticut	United States	For United States Navy.
25 April	Ticonderoga	Ticonderoga-class cruiser	Ingalls Shipbuilding	Pascagoula, Mississippi	United States	For United States Navy.
30 April	SKR-35	Koni-class frigate	Werft 340	Selenodolsk	Soviet Union	For Soviet Navy.
14 May	Mercandian Merchant II	Type FV 610 RoRo-ship	Frederikshavn Vaerft	Frederikshavn	Denmark	For Per Henriksen.
16 May	Abraham Crijnssen	Kortenaer-class frigate	Koninklijke Schelde Groep	Flushing	Netherlands	For Royal Netherlands Navy.
16 May	Jan van Brakel	Kortenaer-class frigate	Koninklijke Schelde Groep	Flushing	Netherlands	For Royal Netherlands Navy.
19 May	Antwerp	Landing craft	Brooke Marine Ltd.	Lowestoft	United Kingdom	For British Army.
19 May	Trelleborg	Ferry	Öresundsvarvet	Landskrona	Sweden	For Statens Järnvägars Färjedrift.
19 May	Pisagua	Type 209 submarine	Howaldtswerke-Deutsche Werft	Kiel	West Germany	For Peruvian Navy.
22 May	GV 909	Cruiseferry	Götaverken	Gothenburg	Sweden	Ordered by Sessan Linjen, order cancelled before delivery
22 May	St. Michaelis	Tanker	AG Weser	Bremen	West Germany	For Hamburg Süd.
29 May	Köln	Bremen-class frigate	Blohm + Voss	Hamburg	West Germany	For German Navy.
2 June	Ark Royal	Invincible-class aircraft carrier	Swan Hunter	Wallsend, England	United Kingdom	For Royal Navy.
5 June	Saint George	Stores carrier	Appledore Shipbuilders Ltd.	Appledore	United Kingdom	For British Army.
17 June	Boxer	Type 22 frigate	Yarrow Shipbuilders	Glasgow, Scotland	United Kingdom	For Royal Navy.
27 June	Reid	Oliver Hazard Perry-class frigate	Todd Pacific Shipyards	San Pedro, California	United States	For United States Navy.
1 July	Trafalgar	Trafalgar-class submarine			United Kingdom	For Royal Navy.
2 July	Crommelin	Oliver Hazard Perry-class frigate	Todd Pacific Shipyards	Seattle, Washington	United States	For United States Navy.
18 July	Willamette	Cimarron-class fleet replenishment oiler	Avondale Shipyard	Avondale, Louisiana	United States	For United States Navy.
24 July	John L. Hall	Oliver Hazard Perry-class frigate	Bath Iron Works	Bath, Maine	United States	For United States Navy.
4 August	Shirayuki	Hatsuyuki-class destroyer			Japan	For Japanese Navy.
22 August	Stena Germanica	Ferry	Stocznia im Lenina	Gdańsk	Poland	For Stena Line.
23 August	Chita	Kilo-class submarine	Leninsky Komsomol Shipyard	Komsomolsk-on-Amur	Soviet Union	For Soviet Navy.
4 September	Mercandian Supplier II	type FV 610 RoRo-ship	Frederikshavn Vaerft	Frederikshavn	Denmark	For Mercandia rederiet A/S.
25 September	La Argentina	Almirante Brown-class destroyer	Blohm + Voss	Hamburg	West Germany	For Argentine Navy.
10 October	Scandinavia	Cruiseferry	Dubigeon-Normandie	Nantes	France	For Scandinavian World Cruises.
13 October	Halyburton	Oliver Hazard Perry-class frigate	Todd Pacific Shipyards	Seattle, Washington	United States	For United States Navy.
16 October	Wimpey Seahorse	Offshore supply vessel	Appledore Shipbuilders Ltd.	Appledore	United Kingdom	For Wimpey Marine Ltd.
17 October	Aubrey Fitch	Oliver Hazard Perry-class frigate	Bath Iron Works	Bath, Maine	United States	For United States Navy.
17 October	Jarrett	Oliver Hazard Perry-class frigate	Todd Pacific Shipyards	San Pedro, California	United States	For United States Navy.
19 October	Blume	Type 209 submarine	Howaldtswerke-Deutsche Werft	Kiel	West Germany	For Peruvian Navy.
31 October	Norfolk	Los Angeles-class submarine	Newport News Shipbuilding	Newport News, Virginia	United States	For United States Navy.
14 November	Florida	Ohio-class submarine	Electric Boat	Groton, Connecticut	United States	For United States Navy.
17 November	Jean de Vienne	Georges Leygues-class frigate			France	For French Navy.
26 November	Song of America	Cruise ship	Wärtsilä Helsinki Shipyard	Helsinki	Finland	For Royal Caribbean International.
5 December	Olau Britannia	Cruiseferry	AG Weser Seebeckswerft	Bremerhaven	West Germany	For Olau Line.
22 December	Mercandian Importer III	Type FV 610 RoRo-ship	Frederikshavn Vaerft	Frederikshavn	Denmark	For Per Henriksen.
24 December	SKR 481	Koni-class frigate	Werft 340	Selenodolsk	Soviet Union	For Soviet Navy.
Date unknown	Fashion of Bristol	Ferry	David Abels Boatbuilders Ltd.	Bristol	United Kingdom	For private owner.
Date unknown	Jacqueline D	Passenger launch	David Abels Boatbuilders Ltd.	Bristol	United Kingdom	For private owner.
Date unknown	Maria Mcloughlin	Tug	David Abels Boatbuilders Ltd.	Bristol	United Kingdom	For John McLoughlin & Son (Shipping) Ltd.
Date unknown	Sarah Mcloughlin	Tug	David Abels Boatbuilders Ltd.	Bristol	United Kingdom	For John McLoughlin & Son (Shipping) Ltd.
Date unknown	Steel Princess	Fishing vessel	David Abels Boatbuilders Ltd.	Bristol	United Kingdom	For private owner.
