= Russian training ship Smolnyy =

Smolnyy-class training ship

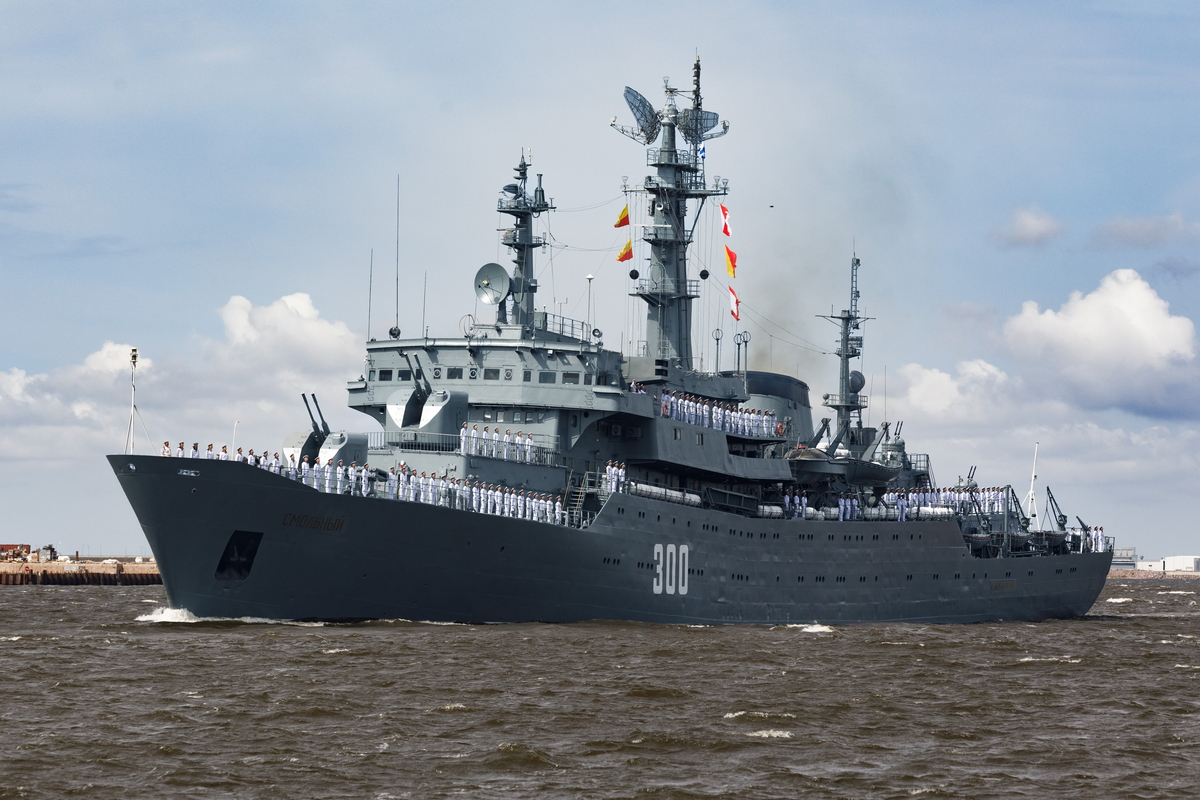
- Smolnyy during Russian Navy Day Parade in 2023

History

Russia
- Name: Smolnyy; (Смольный)
- Namesake: Smolnyy
- Builder: Szczecin Shipyard, Szczecin
- Laid down: 23 April 1974
- Launched: 8 January 1976
- Commissioned: 30 June 1976
- Identification: Pennant number: 210
- Status: Active

General characteristics
- Class & type: Smolnyy-class training ship
- Displacement: 7270 tons full load
- Length: 138 m (453 ft)
- Beam: 17.2 m (56 ft)
- Draught: 5.53 m (18.1 ft)
- Propulsion: 2 shaft diesel, 16,000 hp (12,000 kW)
- Speed: 20 knots (37 km/h; 23 mph)
- Range: 9,000 nautical miles (17,000 km; 10,000 mi) at 14 knots (26 km/h; 16 mph)
- Complement: 132 + 30 Instructors + 300 cadets
- Sensors & processing systems: Radar: Angara-M/Head Net-C 3-D air search; Sonar: Shelon hull mounted MF
- Electronic warfare & decoys: Cat Watch intercept
- Armament: 4 × 76 mm (3 in) guns (2 twin turrets); 2 twin 30 mm anti-aircraft guns; 1 RBU-2500 ASW RL

Smolnyy is the lead ship of the Smolnyy-class training ship of the Russian Navy.

== Development and design ==
The technical project 887 provided for a cruising range of 14 knots up to 9000 miles, a full speed of 20 knots with a standard displacement of 6,120 tons, as well as the placement of a training and production base with 30 teachers and 300 cadets on the ship.

The main power plant is mechanical, two-shaft with two diesel units 12ZV40 / 48 Zgoda Sulzer with a capacity of 8000 liters. from. each located in the MO. The units transmitted rotation through the side shafts to two four-bladed, low-noise variable-pitch propellers (RSh). The power plant is controlled remotely. The diesel is medium-speed, four-stroke, V-shaped, twelve-cylinder. The cylinder diameter is 400 mm, the piston stroke is 480 mm, the speed is 400–600 rpm. The total speed of the ship is 20 knots. The total fuel supply includes 1050 tons. Steam for domestic needs is generated by 2 auxiliary boilers of the "KVS" type.

== Construction and career ==
Smolnyy was laid down 23 April 1974 and launched on 8 January 1976 by Szczecin Shipyard at Szczecin. She was commissioned on 30 June 1976.

Since July 3, 2015, the ship made a long sea voyage to practice cadets of the naval educational institutions of the Russian Defense Ministry, calling at the port of Luanda (Angola), the port of Malabo (Equatorial Guinea) and the coast of Spain (the port of Las Palmas).

From July 1 to October 3, 2016 - a long voyage, during which he visited the port of La Valetta with a business call, several times called in Sevastopol, having covered a total of about 7 thousand nautical miles.

During a 2024 training voyage from its Baltic Fleet base, the vessel visited the ports of Havana in Cuba on 27 July, La Guaira in Venezuela on 6 August, Cape Town in South Africa on 29 August. The voyage continued visiting Walvis Bay in Namibia and Luanda in Angola before entering Malabo in Equatorial Guinea around 20 September.

== Gallery ==
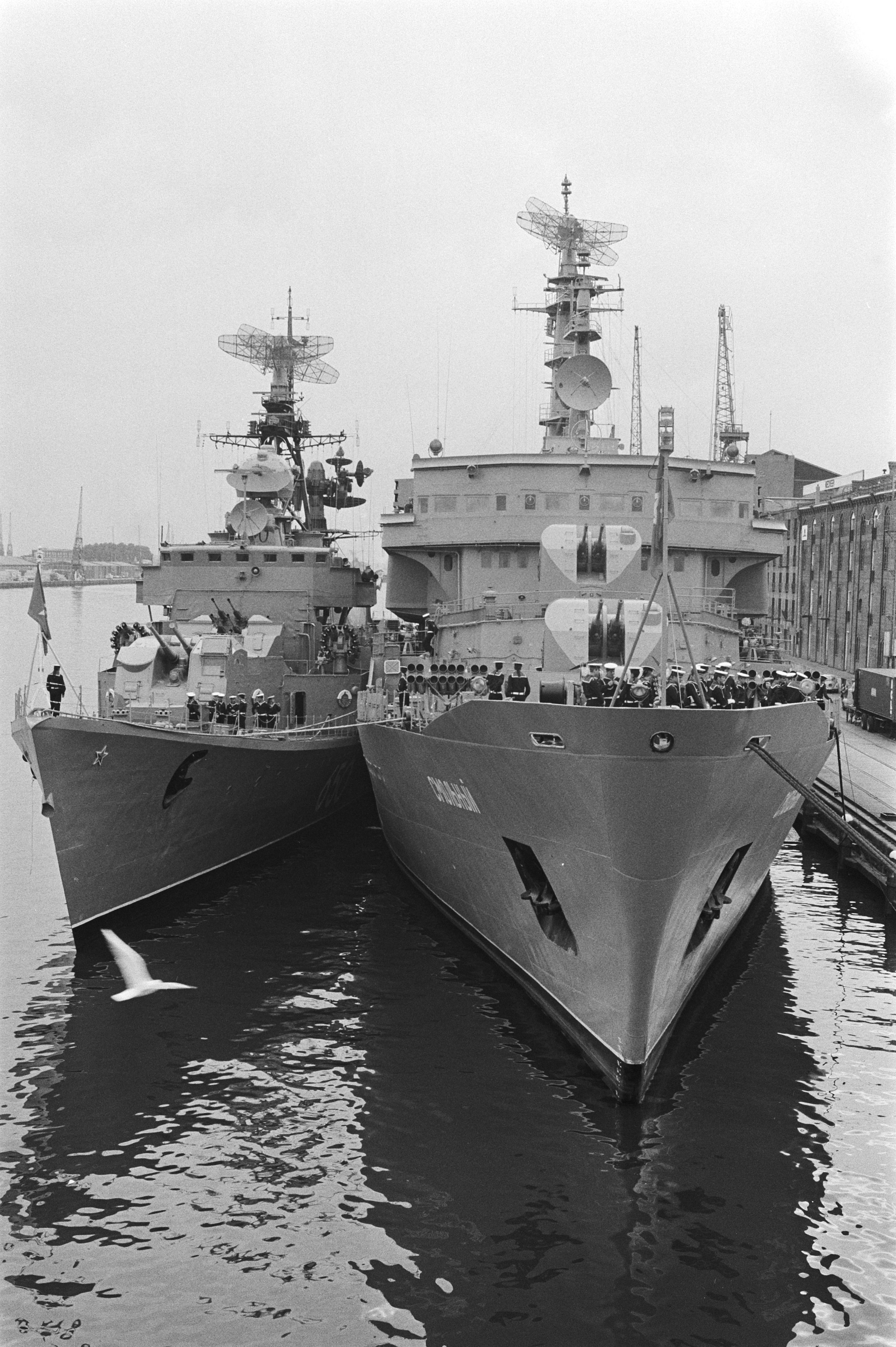
Smolnyy and Nastoychivyy in Amsterdam on 14 June 1978.

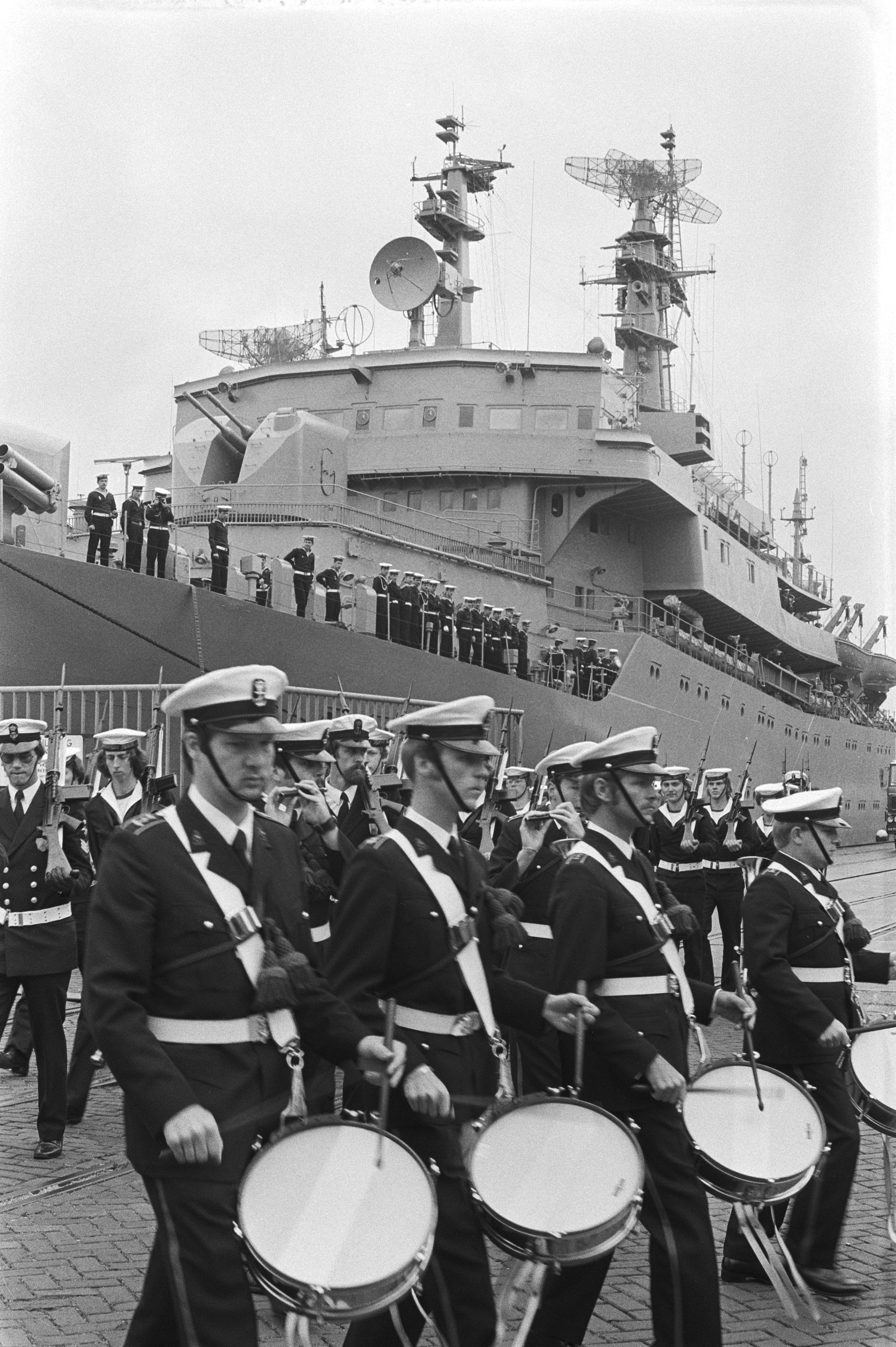
Smolnyy in Amsterdam on 14 June 1978.

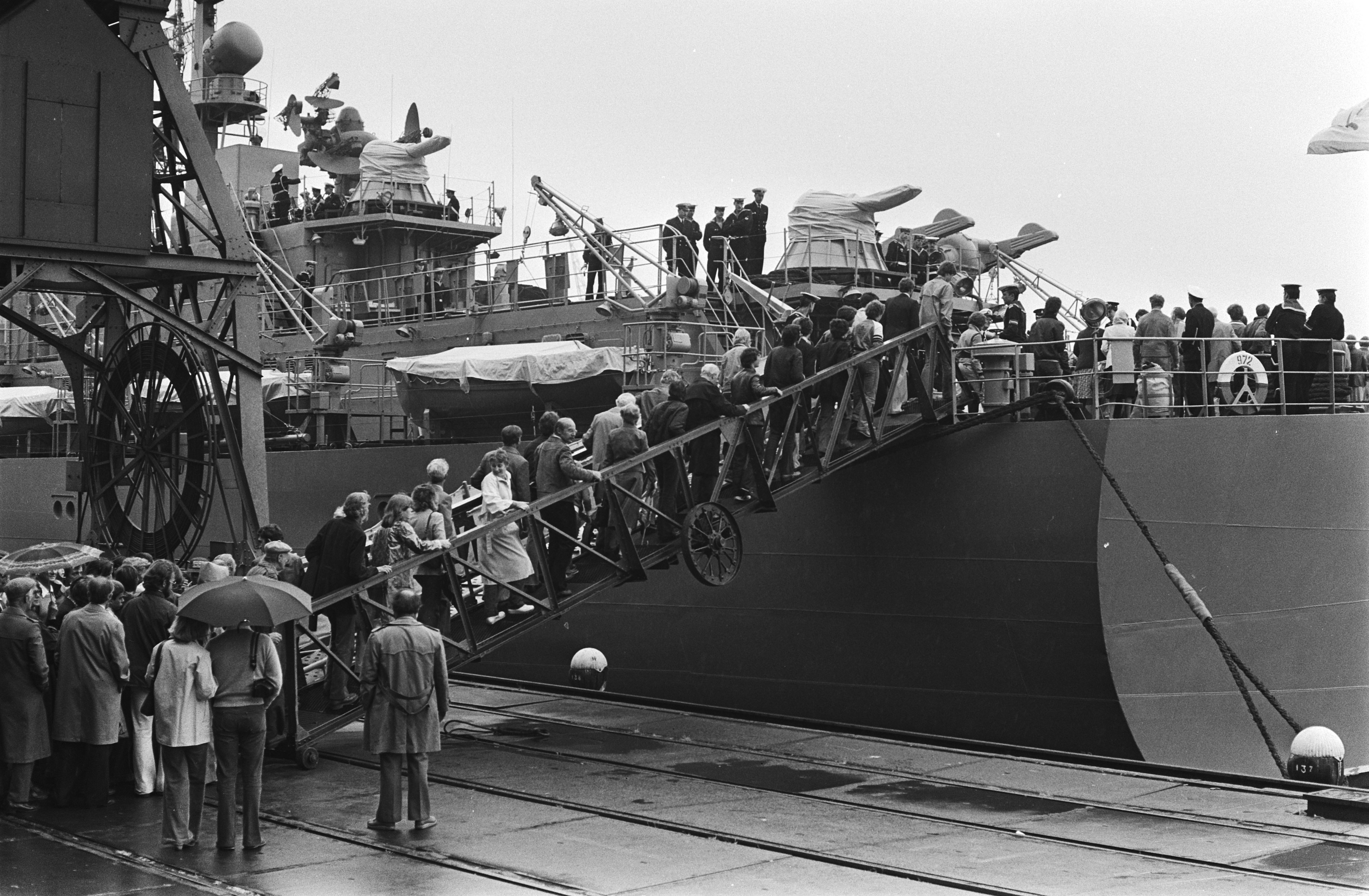
Smolnyy in Amsterdam on 14 June 1978.

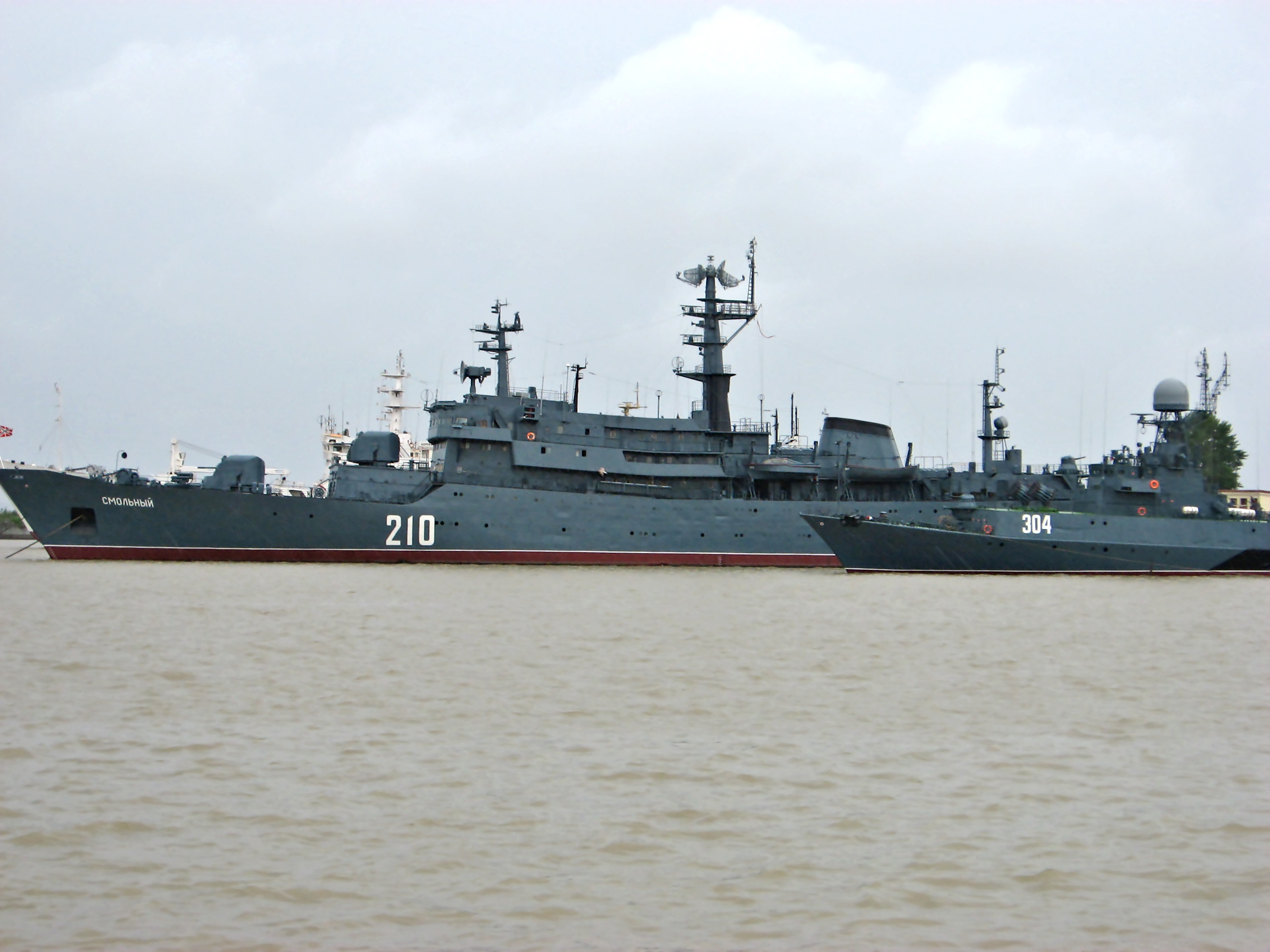
Smolnyy and Urengoy in St. Petersburg on 2 October 2009.

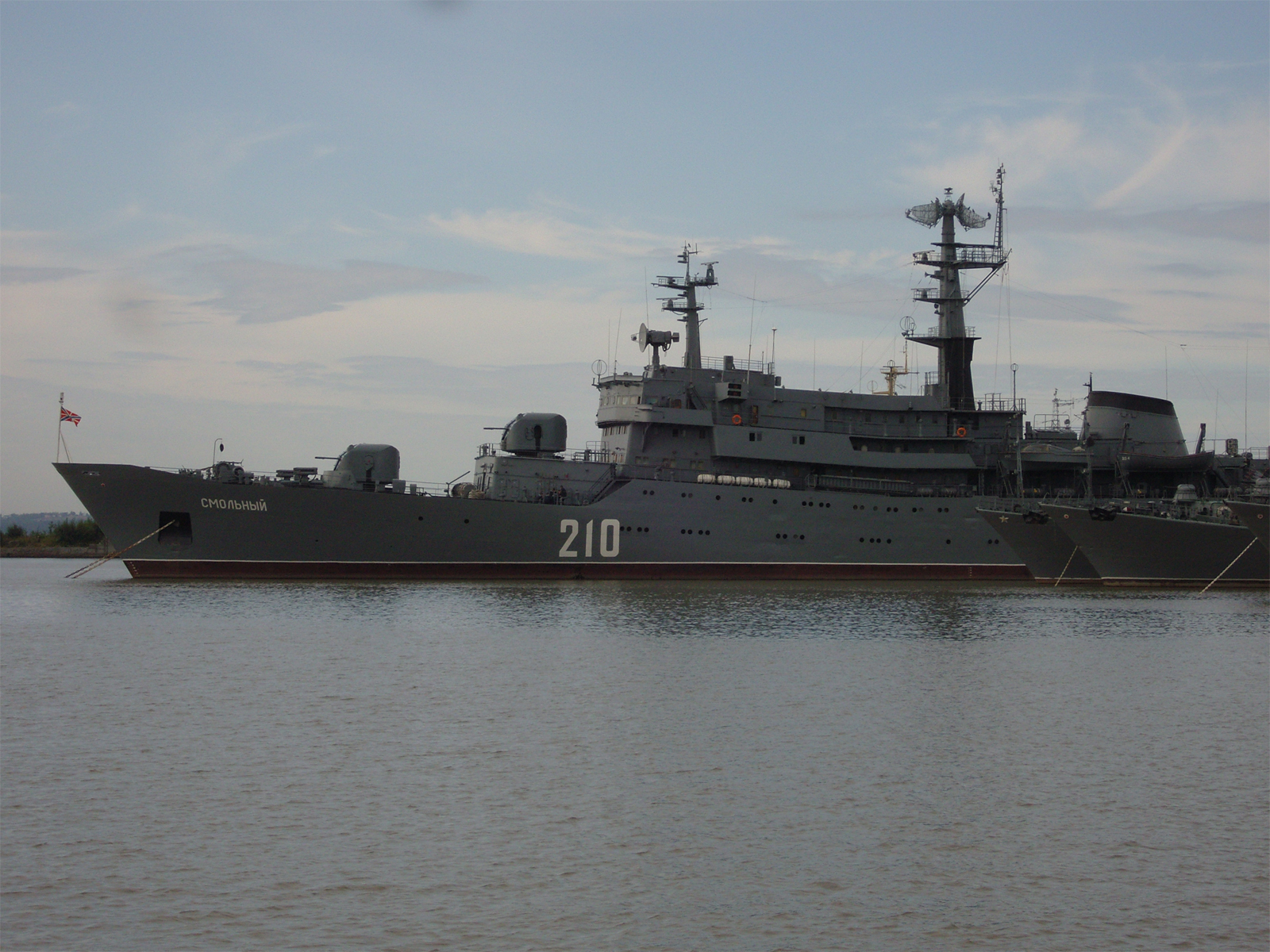
Smolnyy in St. Petersburg on 3 January 2012.

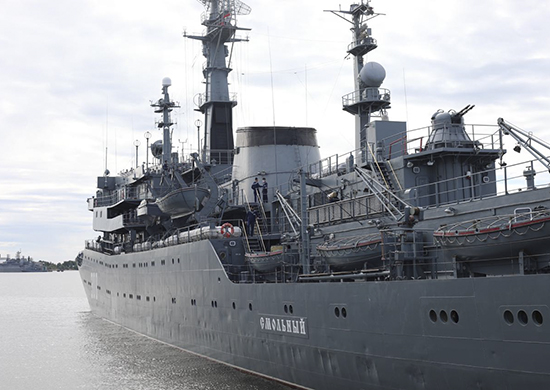
The training ship «Smolnyy» sets off on a navigational campaign

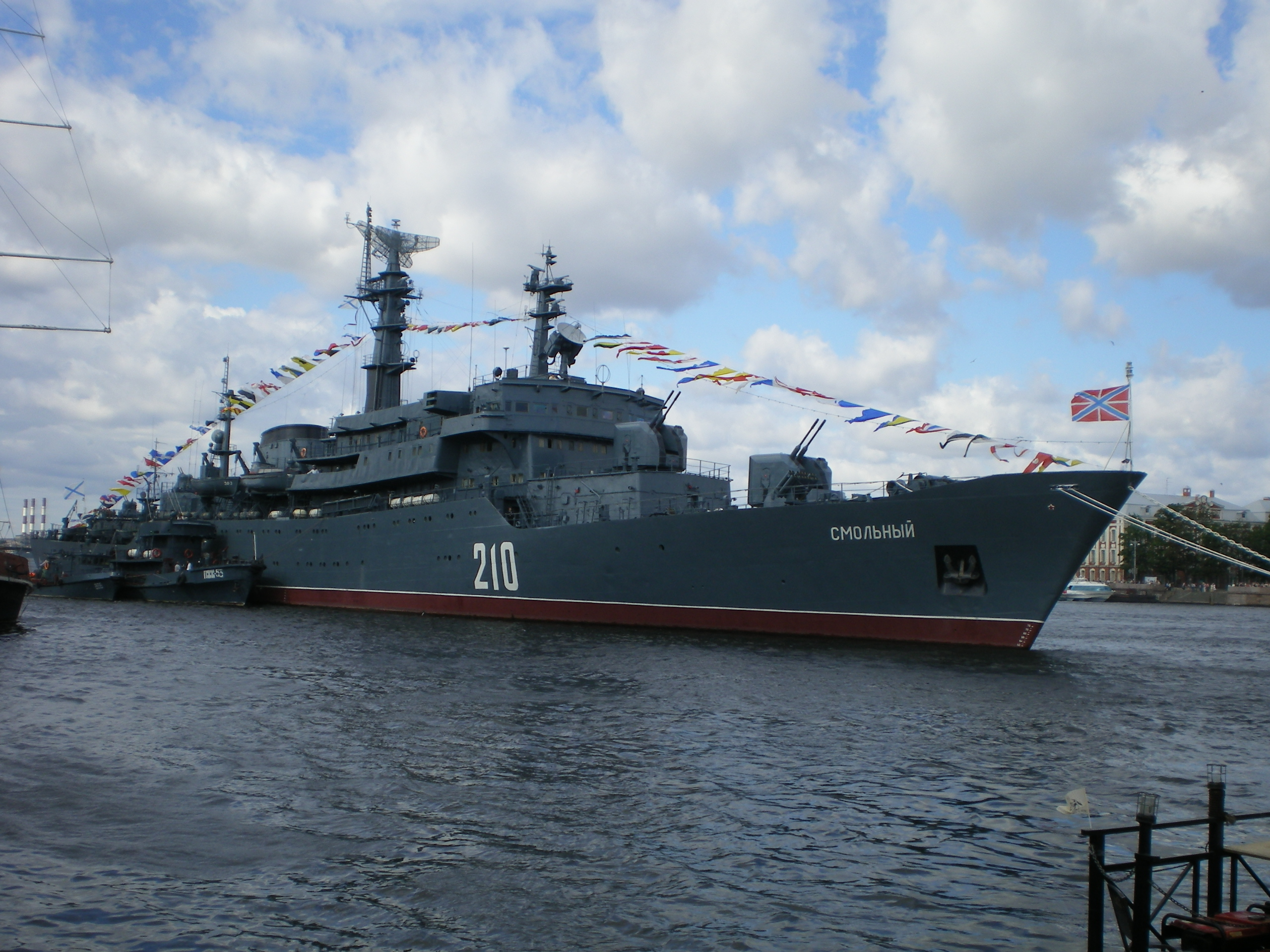
Smolnyy on 27 July 2008
