= INS Nicobar =

History

India
- Name: Nicobar
- Namesake: Nicobar Islands
- Builder: Szczecin Shipyard
- Commissioned: 1998
- Status: in active service

General characteristics
- Type: B561 type troopship
- Displacement: 19,000 long tons (19,305 t) full
- Length: 144 m (472 ft 5 in)
- Beam: 21 m (68 ft 11 in)
- Draft: 6.7 m (22 ft 0 in)
- Propulsion: Two Cegielski-B&W type 6L35MC diesels each rated at 2670 kW, driving two shafts for 5340 kW power.
- Speed: 16 knots (30 km/h; 18 mph)
- Capacity: 1,200 troops
- Complement: 119 design, 160 in practice
- Aviation facilities: Helipad for 1 helicopter

INS Nicobar, is a Nicobar-class troopship. These ships are large, multi-role troopships converted from merchant ships which were originally ordered by the Ministry of Shipping for service with the Shipping Corporation of India. These were later acquired by the Indian Navy for troop transport duties. The ship has large davits for Landing Craft Vehicle Personnel (LCVP) and also features high bridge forward, funnel in the aft, and a helicopter platform at the stern. This makes the vessel suitable for general purpose roles, other than just troop transport.

Ships details
Name	Pennant No.	Previous name	Launched	Date of Commission (in Indian Navy)	Homeport	Status
INS Nicobar	Yard # B-561/1	MV Harshvardhan	12 April 1990	April 1998	Mumbai	Active

== See also ==
- List of active Indian Navy ships
