= Perekop (disambiguation) =

Perekop may refer to:

- Perekop Isthmus, Crimea
- Perekop (town), a destroyed town on the isthmus
- Perekop, a settlement on the isthmus built near the location of the destroyed town
- Perekop Bay or Gulf of Perekop, the northeastern tip of the Karkinit Bay, Crimea, by the isthmus
- Russian training ship Perekop
