= Gruzinsky (settlement) =

Rural locality in Zelenodolsky District, Tatarstan, Russia

Coordinates: 55°51′53″N 48°43′53″E

Gruzinsky (Russian: Грузи́нский; Tatar: Грузинка, romanized: Gruzinka) is a settlement in Zelenodolsky District of the Republic of Tatarstan, Russia, situated 15 kilometers (9.3 mi) east of Zelenodolsk, the administrative center of the district. The village is located on the Kazan–Zelenodolsk road. Gruzinsky's population was 75 in 1989 and 66 in 2000; mostly ethnic Russians and Chuvash people.

It was founded in 1925.
