= Smolnyy-class training ship =

Class of Soviet/Russian ships used to train new sailors

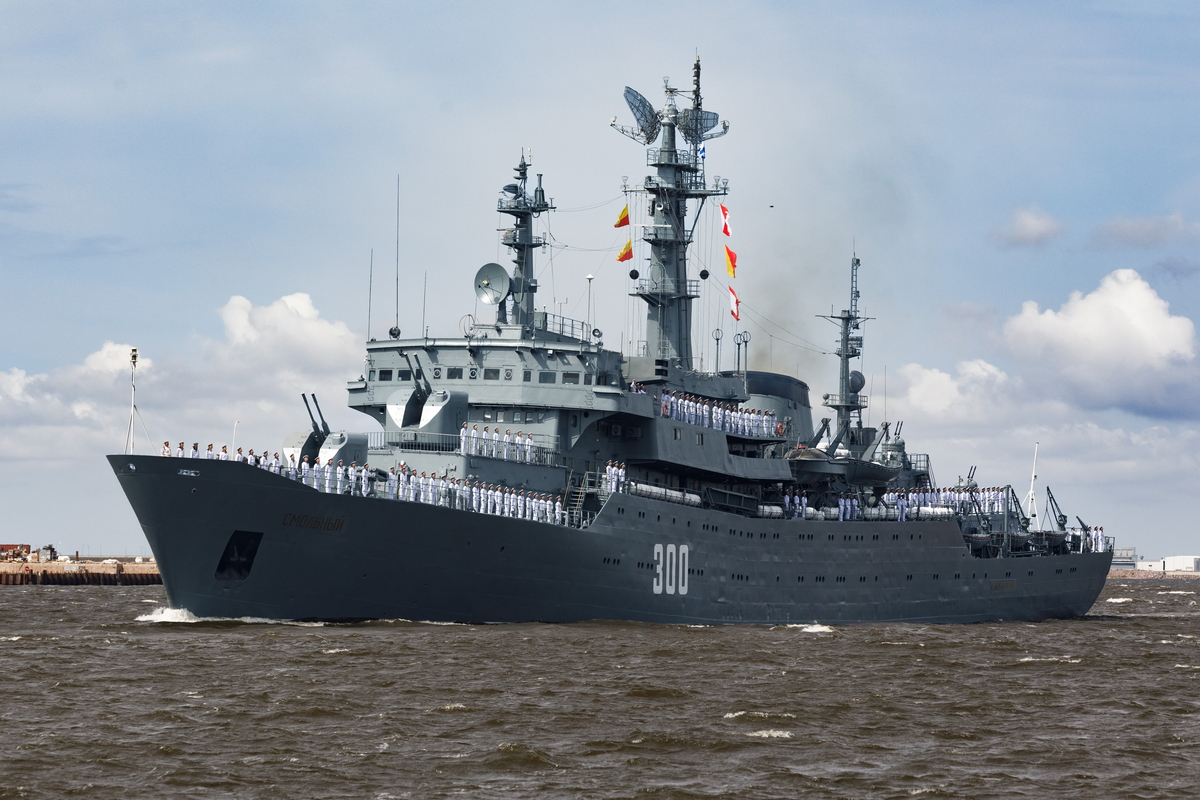
- Smolnyy during Russian Navy Day Parade in 2023

Class overview
- Name: Smolnyy class
- Builders: Szczecin Shipyard, Poland
- Operators: Soviet Navy; Russian Navy
- Completed: 3
- Active: 2
- Retired: 1

General characteristics
- Type: Training ship
- Displacement: 7270 tons full load
- Length: 138 m (453 ft)
- Beam: 17.2 m (56 ft)
- Draught: 5.53 m (18.1 ft)
- Propulsion: 2 shaft diesel, 16,000 hp (12,000 kW)
- Speed: 20 knots (37 km/h; 23 mph)
- Range: 9,000 nautical miles (17,000 km; 10,000 mi) at 14 knots (26 km/h; 16 mph)
- Complement: 132 + 30 Instructors + 300 cadets
- Sensors & processing systems: Radar: Angara-M/Head Net-C 3-D air search; Sonar: Shelon hull mounted MF
- Electronic warfare & decoys: Cat Watch intercept
- Armament: 4 × 76 mm (3 in) guns (2 twin turrets); 2 twin 30 mm anti-aircraft guns; 2 RBU-2500 ASW Rocket Launchers

The Smolnyy or Smol'nyy (Russian Смольный) class, Soviet designation Project 887, are training ships built for the Soviet Navy in the late 1970s. Two ships are operated by the Baltic Fleet of the Russian Navy.

== Design ==
The ships were designed to provide seagoing training facilities for the Soviet Navy. The ships have accommodation for 30 instructors and 300 cadets. They have a basic armament for self-defense and patrol duties.

== Ships ==
The ships were built in Szczecin, Poland for the Soviet Navy

- Smolnyy (Смольный) - Launched 1976, Commissioned 1977, in service with the Baltic Fleet
- Perekop (Перекоп) - Commissioned 1978, in service with the Baltic Fleet
- Khasan (Хасан) - Commissioned 1980, Retired 1999 and scrapped

== See also ==
- List of ships of the Soviet Navy
- List of ships of Russia by project number
