= Nicobar-class troopship =

Multi-role troopships

Class overview
- Builders: Szczecin Shipyard
- Operators: India
- Active: 2

General characteristics
- Type: B561 type troopship
- Displacement: 19,000 long tons (19,305 t) full
- Length: 144 m (472 ft 5 in)
- Beam: 21 m (68 ft 11 in)
- Draft: 6.7 m (22 ft 0 in)
- Propulsion: Two Cegielski-B&W type 6L35MC diesels each rated at 2670 kW, driving two shafts for 5340 kW power.
- Speed: 16 knots (30 km/h; 18 mph)
- Capacity: 1200 troops
- Complement: 119 design, 160 in practice
- Aviation facilities: Helipad for 1 helicopter

Nicobar-class troopships are large multi-role troopships converted from merchant ships which were originally ordered by the Ministry of Shipping for service with the Shipping Corporation of India. These were later acquired by the Indian Navy for troop transport duties. The ships include large davits for Landing Craft Vehicle Personnel (LCVP) and also feature high bridge forward, funnel in the aft and a helicopter platform at the stern. This makes the vessels suitable for general purpose roles, other than just troop transport. The design of the Type B-561 ships built by Szczecin Shipyard of Poland was also sold to India for licensed construction.

== Ships in the class ==
Ships in the class
Name	Pennant No.	Date of Launch	Previous Name	Date of Commission	Date of Commission (in Indian Navy)	Homeport	Status
INS Nicobar	Yard # B-561/1	12 April 1990	M.V.Harshvardhan	5 June 1991	April 1998	Mumbai	Active
INS Andamans	Yard # B-561/2	5 October 1990	M.V.Nancowry	31 March 1992	April 2000		Active

The INS Andamans should not be confused with INS Andaman (P74), the Petya-class frigate that was lost in the Bay of Bengal in 1990 during a naval exercise which were designated as Arnala-class corvettes due to their small size.

== See also ==
- List of active Indian Navy ships
