= Russian training ship Khasan =

Smolnyy-class training ship

History

Russia
- Name: Khasan; (Хасан)
- Namesake: Khasan
- Builder: Szczecin Shipyard, Szczecin
- Laid down: 30 May 1977
- Launched: 31 January 1978
- Commissioned: 28 December 1978
- Decommissioned: 31 May 1998
- Fate: Scrapped

General characteristics
- Class & type: Smolnyy-class training ship
- Displacement: 7270 tons full load
- Length: 138 m (453 ft)
- Beam: 17.2 m (56 ft)
- Draught: 5.53 m (18.1 ft)
- Propulsion: 2 shaft diesel, 16,000 hp (12,000 kW)
- Speed: 20 knots (37 km/h; 23 mph)
- Range: 9,000 nautical miles (17,000 km; 10,000 mi) at 14 knots (26 km/h; 16 mph)
- Complement: 132 + 30 Instructors + 300 cadets
- Sensors & processing systems: Radar: Angara-M/Head Net-C 3-D air search; Sonar: Shelon hull mounted MF
- Electronic warfare & decoys: Cat Watch intercept
- Armament: 4 × 76 mm (3 in) guns (2 twin turrets); 2 twin 30 mm anti-aircraft guns; 1 RBU-2500 ASW RL

Khasan is the third ship of the Smolnyy-class training ship of the Russian Navy.

== Development and design ==
The technical project 887 provided for a cruising range of 14 knots up to 9000 miles, a full speed of 20 knots with a standard displacement of 6,120 tons, as well as the placement of a training and production base with 30 teachers and 300 cadets on the ship.

The main power plant is mechanical, two-shaft with two diesel units 12ZV40 / 48 Zgoda Sulzer with a capacity of 8000 liters. from. each located in the MO. The units transmitted rotation through the side shafts to two four-bladed, low-noise variable-pitch propellers (RSh). The power plant is controlled remotely. The diesel is medium-speed, four-stroke, V-shaped, twelve-cylinder. The cylinder diameter is 400 mm, the piston stroke is 480 mm, the speed is 400–600 rpm. The total speed of the ship is 20 knots. The total fuel supply includes 1050 tons. Steam for domestic needs is generated by 2 auxiliary boilers of the "KVS" type.

== Construction and career ==
Khasan was laid down 30 May 1977 and launched on 31 January 1978 by Szczecin Shipyard at Szczecin. She was commissioned on 28 December 1978.

On September 25, 1985, while passing the Bosphorus in heavy fog, Khasan (sailing with all the proper precautions and signals) rammed and cut in half TCG Meltem, when overtaking her at an angle to its course. The bow of the boat capsized, as a result of the 32 crew of the boat, five Turkish sailors were killed (they are considered missing). Soviet sailors rescued 13 people (according to Turkish data, 14 people): ten from the water and three more from the half-sunken bow of the boat that floated like a float (they were rescued by divers from a training ship who climbed inside the flooded compartments). She was temporarily detained by the Turkish authorities until the circumstances were clarified, but the results of the investigation showed the guilt of the Turkish boat commander, who did not follow the rules of sailing in narrowness in bad weather (the navigation radar was even turned off, and its operator was resting in the cockpit). Already on September 26, the training ship went to Sevastopol.

She was decommissioned on 31 May 1998 and sold for scrap.
