= INS Andamans =

Indian troop ship

History

India
- Name: Andamans
- Namesake: Andaman Islands
- Builder: Szczecin Shipyard
- Launched: 5 October 1990
- Commissioned: 2000
- Fate: Scrapped 12 October 2021

General characteristics
- Type: B561 type troop ship
- Displacement: 19,000 long tons (19,305 t) full
- Length: 144 m (472 ft 5 in)
- Beam: 21 m (68 ft 11 in)
- Draft: 6.7 m (22 ft 0 in)
- Propulsion: Two Cegielski-B&W type 6L35MC diesels each rated at 2670 kW, driving two shafts for 5340 kW power.
- Speed: 16 knots (30 km/h; 18 mph)
- Complement: 119 design, 160 in practice
- Aviation facilities: Helipad for 1 helicopter

INS Andamans is a Nicobar-class troopship. These large multi-role troop ships were converted from merchant ships which were originally ordered by the Ministry of Shipping for service with the Shipping Corporation of India that were later acquired by the Indian Navy for troop transport duties. The ship has large davits for Landing Craft Vehicle Personnel (LCVP) and also features a high bridge forward, funnel in the aft, and a helicopter platform at the stern. This makes the vessel suitable for general purpose roles, other than just troop transport.

INS Andamans should not be confused with INS Andaman (P74), the Petya-class frigate that was lost in the Bay of Bengal in 1990 during a naval exercise, which were designated as Arnala-class corvettes in Indian Navy due to their small size.

Ships Details
Name	Pennant No.	Previous name	Launched	Date of Commission (in Indian Navy)	Homeport	Status
INS Andamans	Yard # B-561/2	MV Nancowry	5 October 1990	April 2000		Active
