= EasyCruiseOne =

Cruise ship

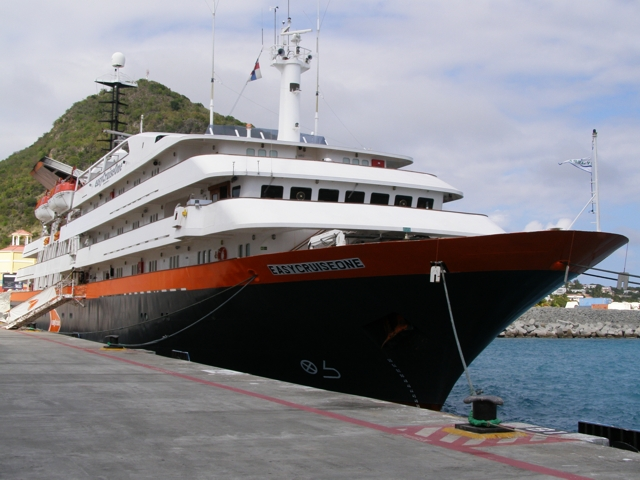
- EasyCruiseOne in April 2007.

History
- Name: CruiseOne (2008-2022); EasyCruiseOne (2005-2008); Neptune II (1998-2004); Renaissance II (1990-1998)
- Owner: Unknown (2008-2022); EasyCruise (2005-2008); Unknown Company (1998-2004); Renaissance Cruises (1990-1998)
- Operator: Unknown/None (2008-2022); EasyCruise (2005-2008); Unknown Casino Charter (1998-2004); Renaissance Cruises (1990-1998)
- Port of registry: Ecuador
- Builder: La Spezia (Italy)
- Launched: November 1988
- Completed: April 1990
- Maiden voyage: 1990
- In service: 1990
- Out of service: October 2008
- Identification: IMO number: 8708658; Callsign: 9HJU9
- Fate: Scrapped in 2022.

General characteristics
- Tonnage: 4,077 GT
- Length: 289 ft (88 m)
- Decks: 6
- Speed: 15.5 knots (28.7 km/h; 17.8 mph)
- Capacity: 100
- Crew: 75

The EasyCruise One (styled as easyCruise One, also Easycruiseone) was a cruise ship last owned by a private owner and last operated by EasyCruise.

== History ==
It was originally built for Renaissance Cruises as the Renaissance II in 1990. In 1998 it was renamed as the gambling ship Neptune II for operations in Singapore. When EasyCruise was formed, Stelios Haji-Ioannou purchased the ship, gave it an extensive refit, and launched it as EasyCruise One in 2005. EasyCruise One was retired from the fleet in October 2008.

The ship was sold soon after and was renamed Cruise One. The ship was planned to be converted into a luxury mega yacht. However, the Great Recession halted its conversion. The ship was laid up in Port Rashid in Dubai and later stored at a dry berth at the nearby Dubai Maritime City and was put up for sale. The asking cost and the cost to renovate the ship were too great and saw no buyers. The ship never saw any service again. In July 2022, the ship was sold for scrap and was broken up on-site together with the former HMAS Cook laid-up next to it soon after.

== The ship as EasyCruise One ==
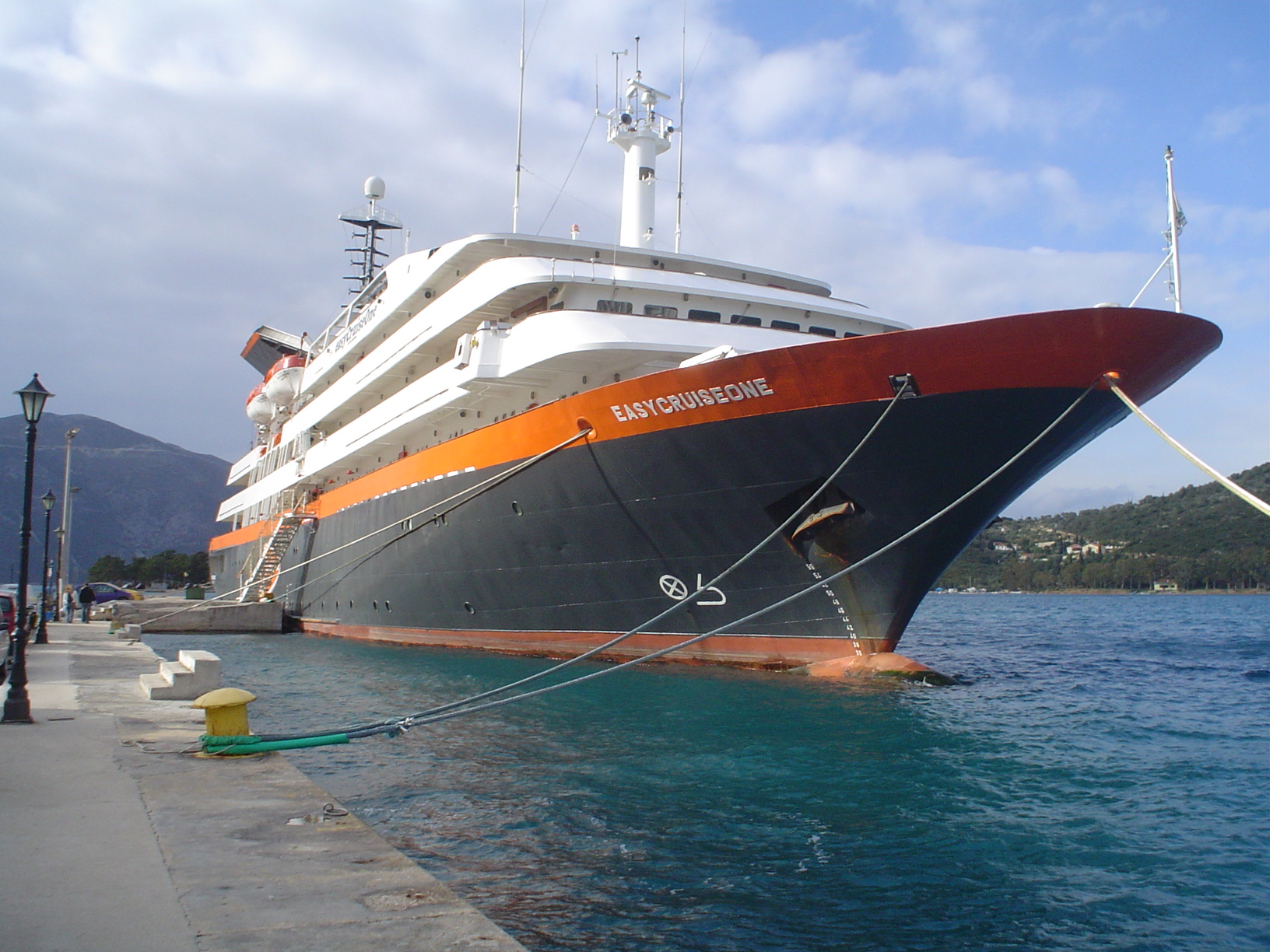
EasyCruiseOne

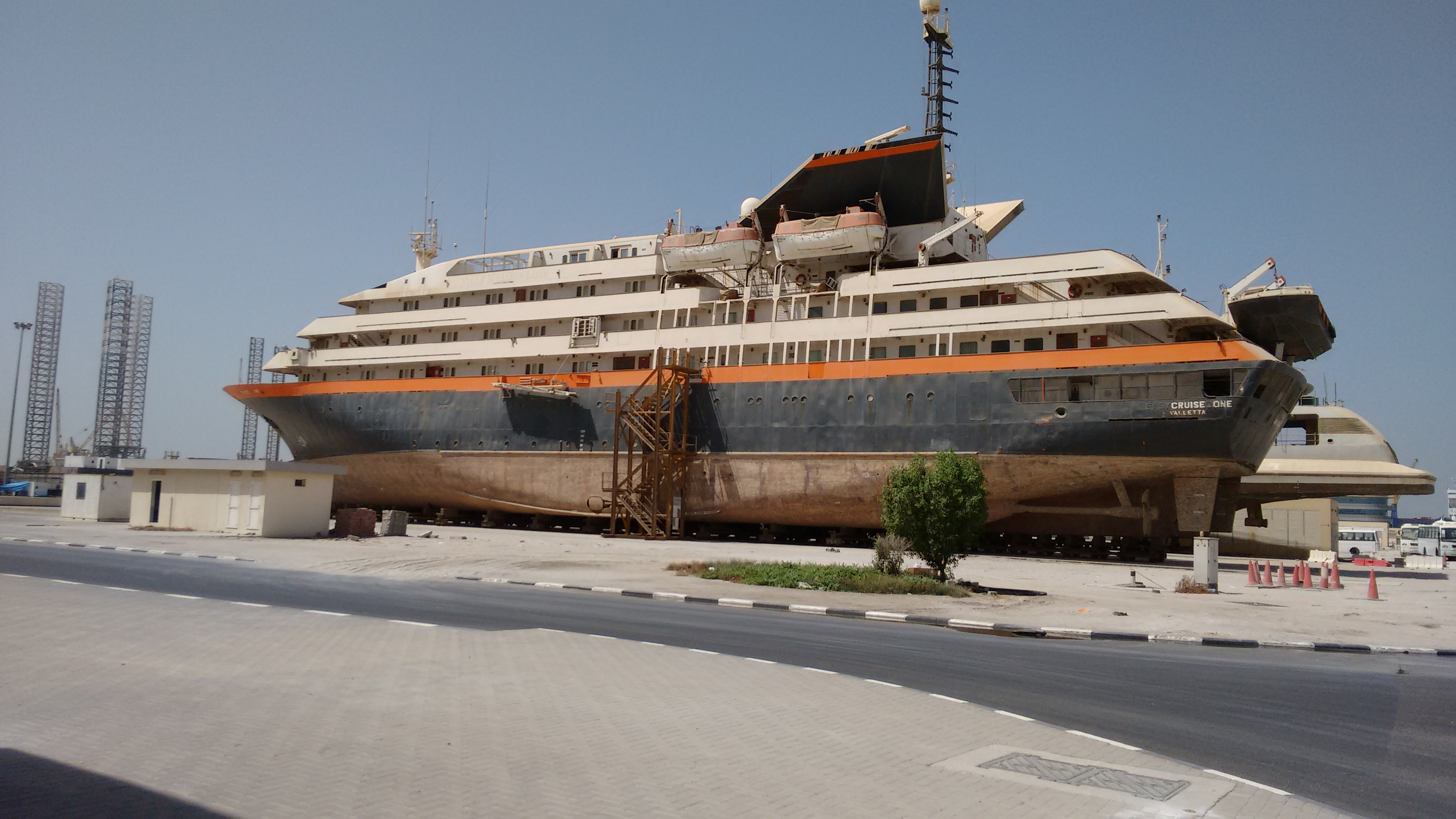
EasyCruiseOne as CruiseOne laid up at Dubai Maritime City in September 2015.

The ship's hull was originally painted orange with a white "Easycruise.com" website message on both sides. It was later repainted black with an orange stripe and an "EasyCruise.com" logo on both sides of the ship.

=== Itinerary ===
EasyCruise One operated along the north shore of the Mediterranean and the Greek islands. In the winters of 2005 through 2007, the ship sailed to various islands in the Caribbean.

=== Services on board ===
The amenities and services on board EasyCruise One were "no frills" and most were not included in the fare and provided for at additional cost. Things like food, cabin cleaning, and maid service were charged for when used.

=== Facilities ===
All cabins included a very simple bed and bathroom, with bare amenities. The bathroom for most cabins consisted of a glass-walled area containing both a toilet and shower. Most beds consisted of a mattress placed on the floor with a simple fitted bed sheet and duvet. Most of the cabins in size were around 110 square feet (10 m2). Two- and four-passenger cabins were available, as were a limited number of "luxury" suites.

For the original fitting of easyCruise One, the cabins were pre-constructed ashore, and time precluded measuring the position of portholes and cutting matching window spaces. This resulted in none of the interior cabins being fitted with windows - although four "balcony suites" had glass doors leading onto outside balconies. Problems were encountered with the integral shower and toilet cubicle design, with the shower water failing to drain correctly and spilling into the rest of the cabin. Passengers also found it difficult to deal with the unremitting orange color scheme and lack of cabin windows. The shower cubicles were fitted with small barriers, partitioning the shower floor from the rest of the shower/toilet cubicle, providing a cheap but adequate fix to the flooding problem. Facilities consisted of a small general store and gift shop, a coffee shop on deck 2, an "English"-themed bar on deck 4 with an evening DJ, and a cocktail bar and hot tub on the upper deck.

After the concept was considered proven the ship was refitted, the ubiquitous orange interior was toned down to mere orange accents with charcoal and grey tones, and window spaces was cut for the interior cabins. The hull of the ship was repainted from orange to black with orange accents. The coffee shop was replaced with new cabins, and the sports bar was remodelled into a restaurant, 'Fusion on Four. An internet cafe and gym were added. The gym, initially on the second deck, was later moved to the top deck in the 'Wellness Zone'.
