= Dmitri Shostakovich-class ferry =

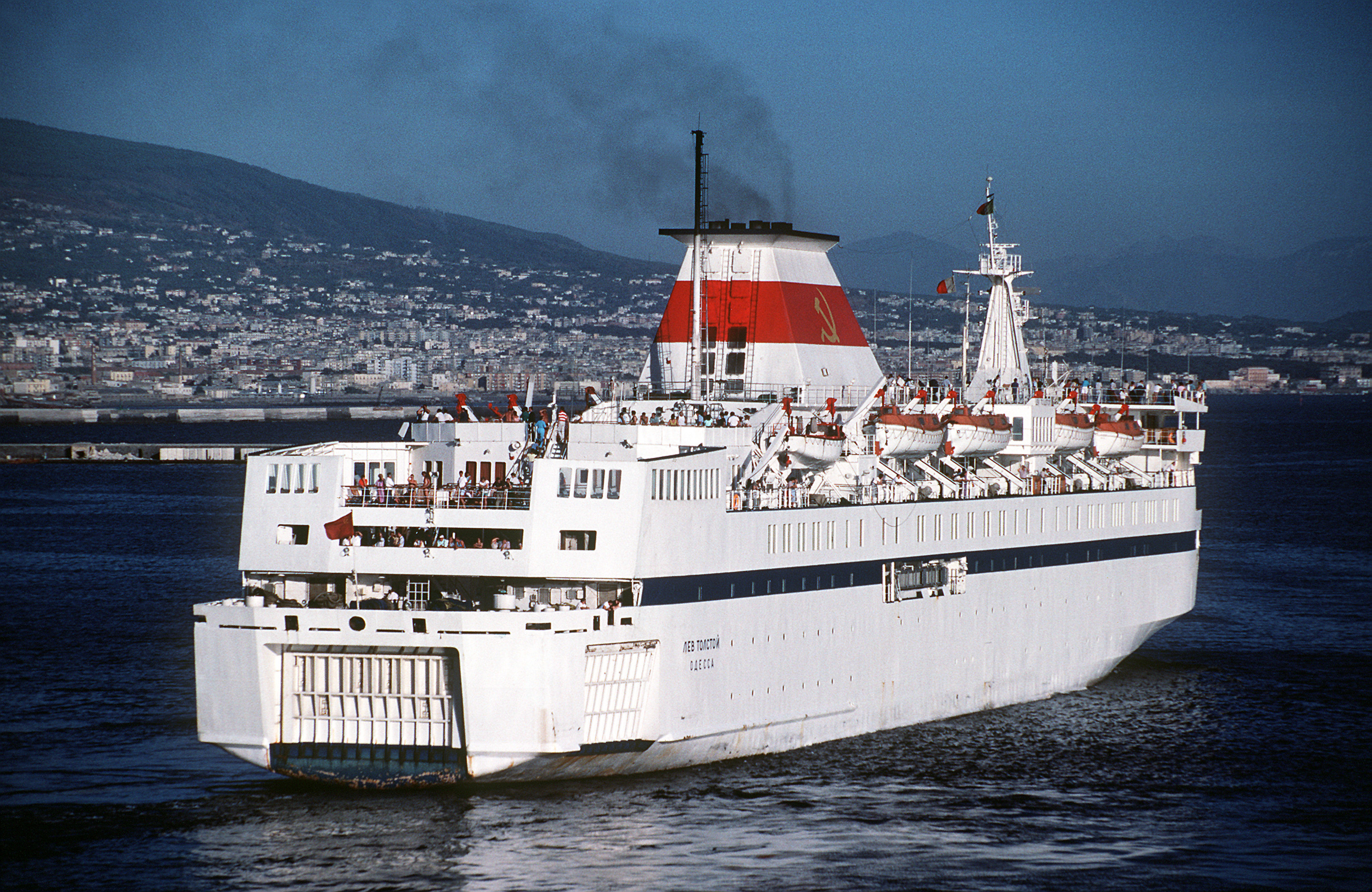
- Lev Tolstoy approaching the Port of Naples on 9 September 1988

Class overview
- Builders: Stocznia Szczecinska im Adolfa Warskiego Warskiego, Szczecin, Poland
- Built: 1980–1986
- Planned: 7
- Completed: 7
- Active: 1
- Retired: 6

General characteristics
- Type: Ro-pax ferry
- Tonnage: 9,878 GT; 1,445 DWT
- Length: 133.15 m (437 ft)
- Beam: 21.0 m (68.9 ft)
- Depth: 5.6 m (18.4 ft)
- Decks: 9 total, 6 passenger decks
- Installed power: 4 × Sulzer-Skoda diesels; combined 12,800 kW
- Propulsion: Twin propellers
- Speed: 20 knots
- Capacity: 420 passengers
- Crew: 167

The Dmitri Shostakovich class is a class of seven ro-pax ferries of project B-492/B-493 originally built by Stocznia Szczecinska im Adolfa Warskiego Warskiego in Szczecin, Poland and used by the Soviet shipping companies, Black Sea Shipping Company, Estonian Shipping Company, Baltic Shipping Company and Far Eastern Shipping Company, as ferries and passenger/cruise ships. The class is named after the first ship in the class Dmitri Shostakovich, which in her turn was named after composer Dmitri Shostakovich.

== Ship features ==
The ships have two restaurants, three bars, solarium, sauna and resting area.

== Ferries of the Polish project B492/493 ==
Dmitriy Shostakovich-class ferries
No.	Original name	English transliteration
1	Дмитрий Шостакович (Paloma I, Paloma, Paloma I, Royale Star, New Imperial Star)	Dmitri Shostakovich (Paloma I, Paloma, Paloma I, Royale Star, New Imperial Star)
2	Георг Отс (Georg Ots, Георг Отс)	Georg Ots (Georg Ots, Georg Ots)
3	Лев Толстой (Natasha, Palmira, The Jasmin, Farah, Easycruise Life, Ocean Life)	Lev Tolstoy (Natasha, Palmira, The Jasmin, Farah, Easycruise Life, Ocean Life)
4	Константин Симонов (Francesca, The Iris, Kristina Katarina, Ocean Endeavour)	Konstantin Simonov (Francesca, The Iris, Kristina Katarina, Ocean Endeavour)
5	Михаил Суслов (Петр Первый, Ocean Empress, Ocean Jewel of St. Petersburg)	Mikhail Suslov (Petr Pervyy, Ocean Empress, Ocean Jewel of St. Petersburg)
6	Михаил Шолохов (Mikhail, Ούγκο Φόσκολο, Fos I, Phoenix)	Mikhail Sholokhov (Mikhail, Ugo Foscolo, Fos I, Phoenix)
7	Константин Черненко (Русь, Rus, SC Atlantic, Ocean Atlantic)	Konstantin Chernenko (Rus (ru), Rus, SC Atlantic, Ocean Atlantic)

== Overview ==
Year of build	Yard No	Image	Name	Built for	Owner	Operator	Port of Registry	Flag	IMO	Status
1980	492/01		New Imperial Star	BLASCO	Everis Capital Holdings	Everis Capital Holdings	Odessa → Kingstown → Odessa → Kingstown	→ → → →	7625794	originally, the Dmitri Shostakovich, formerly: Paloma I, Paloma, Paloma I, Royale Star, scrapped in 2016
May 1980	493/01		Georg Ots	ESCO	Primorskiy Region	Vladivostok Branch	Tallinn → Saint Petersburg → Vladivostok	→ →	7625835	originally built as cruise ship, the Georg Ots, formerly: rebuilt to ropax ferry Georg Ots (et), Georg Ots (ru), scrapped illegally 2012 in China.
1980	492/02		Ocean Life	BLASCO	World Cruises	Blue Ocean Cruises	Odessa → Monrovia → Odessa → Kingstown → Amman → Valletta	→ → → → → →	7625809	originally, the Lev Tolstoy, formerly: Natasha, Palmira, The Jasmin, Farah, Easycruise Life; scrapped in Aliağa in 2014.
April 1982	492/03		Ocean Endeavour	FESCO			Vladivostok → Odessa → Leningrad → Saint Petersburg → Limassol → Valletta → Kotka → Majuro	→ → → → →	7625811	originally, the Konstantin Simonov, formerly: Francesca, The Iris, Kristina Katarina
December 1982	492/04		Ocean Jewel of St. Petersburg	BLASCO		—	Odessa → Kingstown	→ →	7625823	originally, the Mikhail Suslov, formerly: Petr Pervyy, Ocean Empress, scrapped in Venezuela in 2013
1986	492/05		Phoenix	FESCO	Adalia Maritime Co.	—	Vladivostok → Phnom Penh → Piraeus → Phnom Penh → Panama City → Basseterre	→ → → → → →	8325420	originally, the Mikhail Sholokhov, formerly: Mikhail, Ugo Foscolo, Fos I, scrapped in 2011
December 1986	492/06		Ocean Atlantic	FESCO	Ocean Atlantic Partners		Vladivostok → Majuro	→ →	8325432	originally, the Konstantin Chernenko, Rus (ru), Rus, SC Atlantic; arrived in Aliağa for scrapping in May 2025
