= HMAS Cook =

Research ship built in 1981

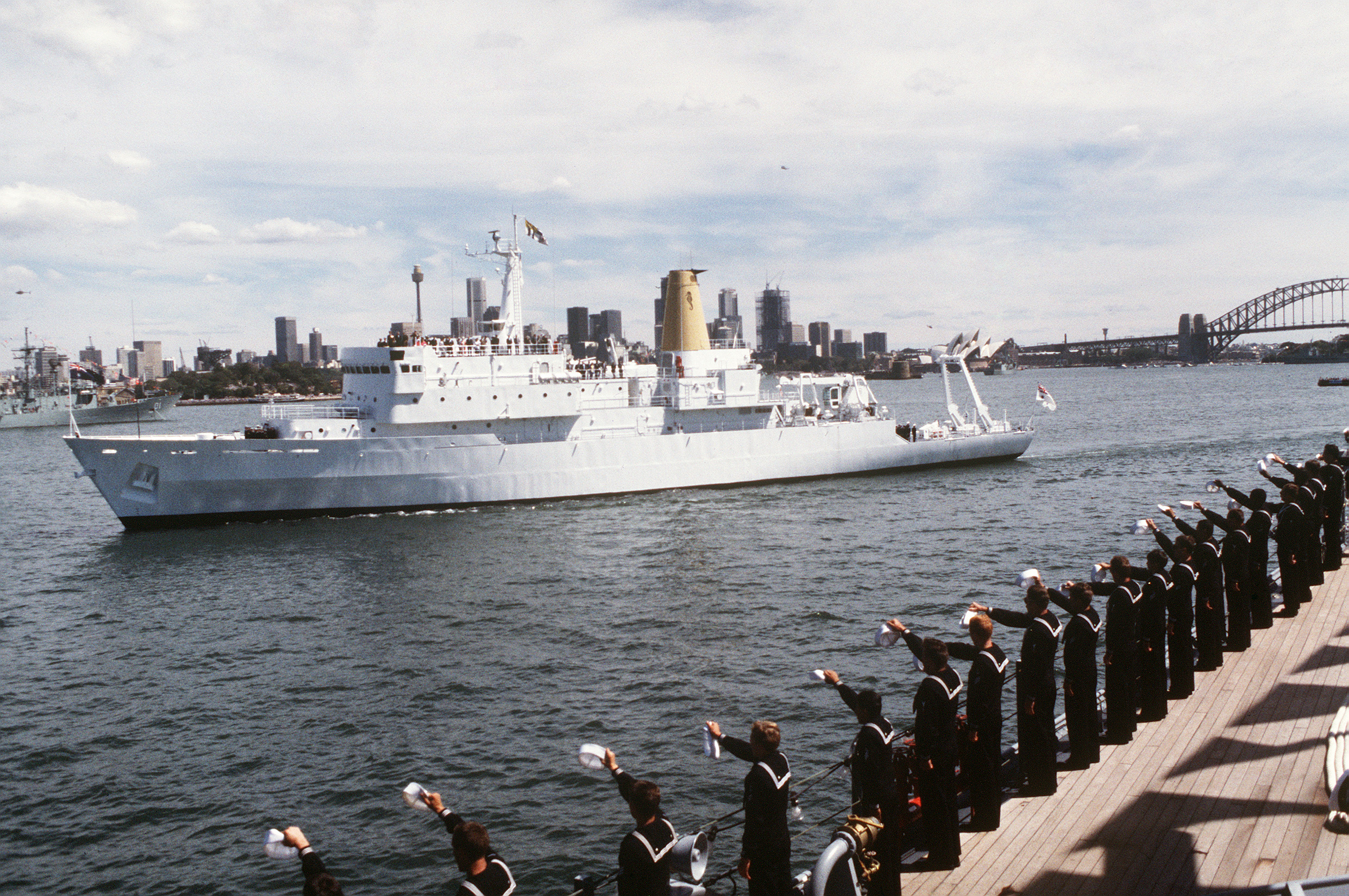
- Sailors from USS Missouri cheer to honour Prince Philip as he passes by aboard HMAS Cook in 1986

History

Australia
- Namesake: Captain James Cook
- Builder: HMA Naval Dockyard, Williamstown, Victoria
- Laid down: 30 September 1974
- Launched: 27 August 1977
- Commissioned: 28 January 1980
- Decommissioned: 31 October 1990
- Identification: IMO number: 8872784
- Motto: "With Diligence and Skill"
- Fate: Converted to merchant vessel, fate unknown
- Badge

General characteristics
- Type: Oceanographic research vessel
- Length: 316.6 feet (96.5 m) in length overall
- Beam: 44 feet (13 m)
- Draught: 15.1 feet (4.6 m)
- Propulsion: Diesels; 2 shafts
- Speed: 17 knots (31 km/h; 20 mph)
- Range: 11,000 nautical miles (20,000 km; 13,000 mi) at 14 knots (26 km/h; 16 mph)
- Complement: 150 + 13 scientists
- Armament: Light calibre weapons only

HMAS Cook (GOR 291/A 219), named after Captain James Cook, was an oceanographic research vessel of the Royal Australian Navy (RAN).

Design work for a dedicated oceanographic research vessel to replace the converted frigate HMAS Diamantina began in the late 1960s. The ship was ordered in 1973. Cook was 316.6 feet (96.5 m) in length overall, with a beam of 44 feet (13 m) and a draught of 15.1 feet (4.6 m). Displacement was 1,900 tons at standard load, and 2,450 tons at full load. Propulsion machinery consisted of diesel engines, connected to two shafts driving variable pitch propellers . A bow thruster and an active rudder provided extra maneuverability, especially when the ship was required to remain in one position at sea for oceanographic measurements. Top speed was 17 knots (31 km/h; 20 mph), with a range of 11,000 nautical miles (20,000 km; 13,000 mi) at 14 knots (26 km/h; 16 mph). Cook was operated by a ship's company of 150, with facilities for up to 13 civilian scientists. The ship's armament was limited to light calibre weapons only.

Cook was laid down by HMA Naval Dockyard at Williamstown, Victoria, on 30 September 1974, launched on 27 August 1977 and commissioned into the RAN on 28 January 1980. After a six-year construction period the ship spent another two years in dockyard hands fixing defects from the building period, including the realignment of the entire propulsion mechanism to reduce vibration.

Cook paid off on 31 October 1990 and was sold for conversion as a small cruise ship and subsequently renamed "Maria Kosmas" - IMO number 8872784. As of 2009, the vessel was in the United Arab Emirates) under the name "Cosmos", in the hands of Platinum Yachts and laid up next to the EasyCruiseOne for conversion into a private yacht, but work had been suspended. In 2022, both vessels were dismantled even though the conversion had made progress earlier.
