= MV Ocean Life =

Cruise ship

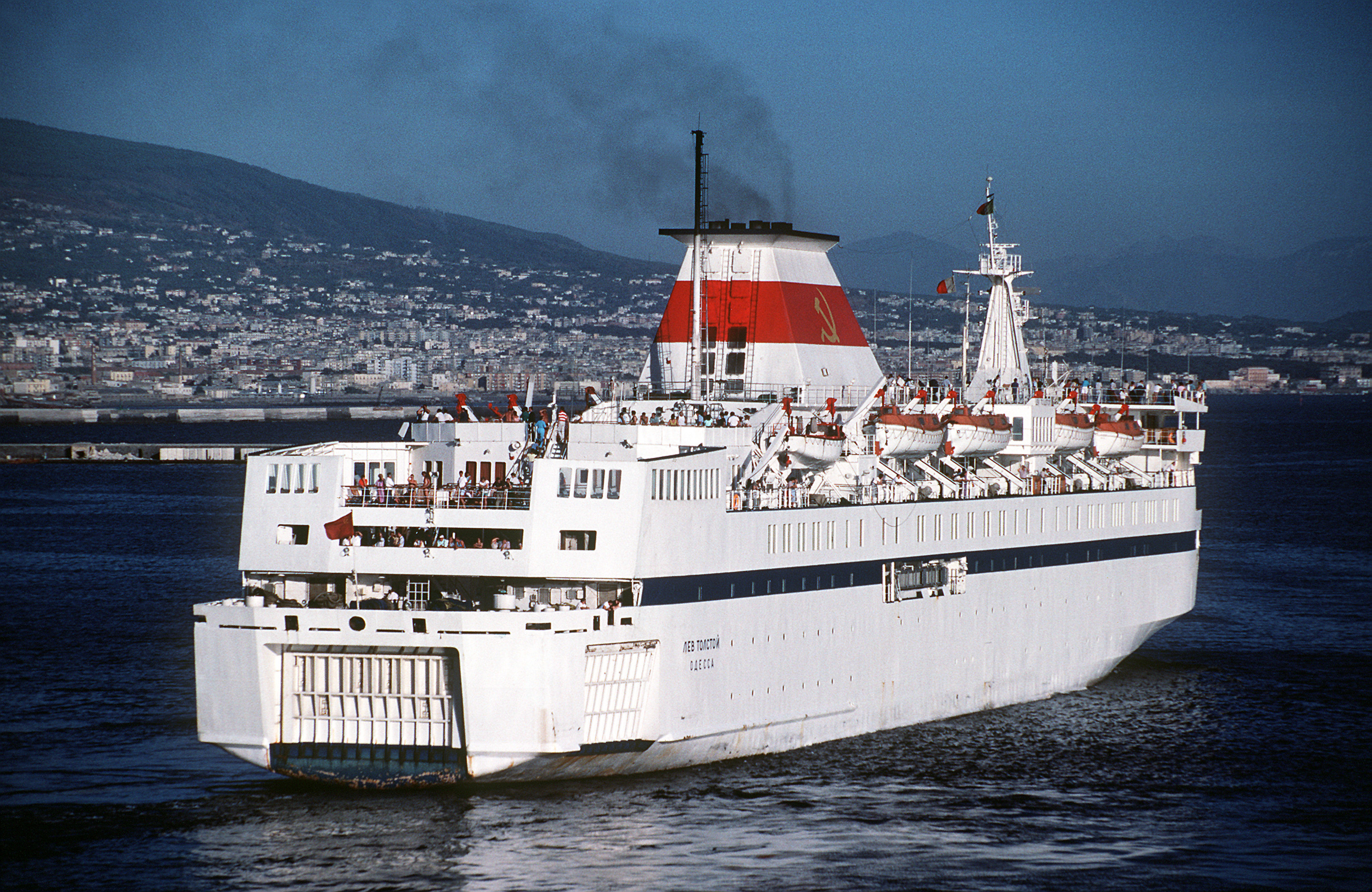
- Lev Tolstoy at Naples in 1988.

History
- Name: 1981–1995: Lev Tolstoy; 1995–1998: Natasha; 1998–2001: Palmira; 2001–2006: The Jasmine; 2006–2007: Farah; 2007–2010: EasyCruise Life; 2010–2014: Ocean Life
- Namesake: Leo Tolstoy (original name)
- Owner: 1981–1995: Black Sea Shipping Company; 1995–1996: Blasco IK; 1996–2001: Black Sea Shipping Company; 2001–2006: Mano Maritime; 2006–2007: International Maritime Investment Co Ltd; 2007–2009: EasyCruise; 2010–2014: Hellenic Seaways
- Operator: 1981–2001: Black Sea Shipping Company (?); 2001–2006: Mano Maritime; 2006–2007: Salam International Transport & Trading Co; 2007–2009: EasyCruise; 2010 onwards: Blue Ocean Cruises
- Port of registry: 1981–1992: Odesa, Soviet Union; 1992–1995: Odesa, Ukraine; 1995–1996: Monrovia, Liberia; 1996–2001: Odesa, Ukraine; 2001–2006: Kingstown, Saint Vincent and the Grenadines; 2006–2007: Amman, Jordan; 2007–2010:Limassol, Cyprus; 2010–2014: Valletta, Malta
- Builder: Stocnia Szczecinska im A Warskiego, Szczecin, Poland
- Yard number: 492/02
- Launched: 6 February 1981
- Completed: 1981
- Maiden voyage: 1981
- In service: October 1981
- Out of service: 2014
- Identification: Call sign: 9HGB9; IMO number: 7625809; MMSI number: 256935000
- Fate: Scrapped in 2014.

General characteristics (as built)
- Class & type: Dmitriy Shostakovich-class ferry
- Tonnage: 9,878 GT; 1,445 DWT
- Length: 134.50 m (441.27 ft)
- Beam: 21.00 m (68.90 ft)
- Depth: 5.60 m (18.37 ft)
- Decks: 9
- Installed power: 4 × Sulzer 6 LZ40/48 diesels; 12800 kW
- Speed: 20 kn (37 km/h)
- Range: 4,100 nmi (7,600 km)
- Capacity: 350 passengers

General characteristics (as cruise ship)
- Class & type: Cruise ship (since 1 October 2010)
- Tonnage: 12,711 GT
- Speed: 17 knots (service speed)
- Capacity: 550 passengers
- Crew: 98

The MV Ocean Life was a cruise ship for a number of cruise lines, including Hellenic Seaways and Blue Ocean Cruises, under a number of names. She was sold for scrap in 2014.

== History ==
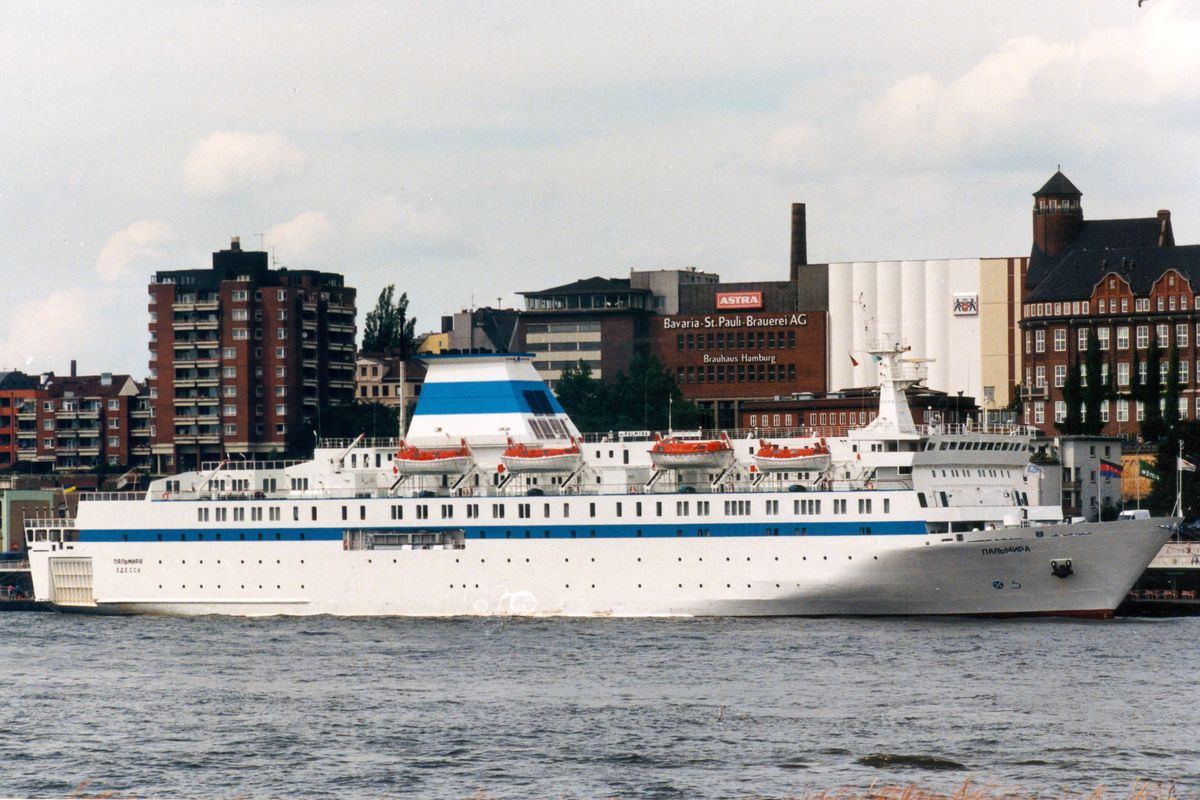
Palmira at Hamburg in 1999.

She was built in 1981 as a Dmitriy Shostakovich-class ferry by Stocnia Szczecinska im A Warskiego, Szczecin, Poland as Lev Tolstoy for the Black Sea Shipping Company. She was third in a series of seven near-identical ferries built for various shipping companies of the Soviet Union. She sailed under the names Natasha, Palmira, The Jasmine, Farah, EasyCruise Life and finally Ocean Life with Blue Open Cruise Lines, who operated her on a series of Indian coastal voyages.

== Fate ==
The ship was sold for scrapping at Aliağa, Turkey, in August 2014.

== Incidents ==
On her maiden voyage with Blue Open Cruise Lines on 18 November 2010, with over 400 passengers and 134 crew on board the Ocean Life developed a crack on her port side 17 nmi (31 km) off of Goa, in the Arabian Sea. The ship started taking on water and began to list five degrees. The vessel was moved to Western India Shipyard for repairs.

== See also ==
- Dmitriy Shostakovich-class ferry
