= EasyCruise =

European cruise operator

- Company type: Leisure Travel
- Founded: April 2004
- Founder: Stelios Haji-Ioannou
- Defunct: 2010
- Fate: Discontinued
- Headquarters: Athens, Greece
- Owner: Hellenic Seaways
- Website: easycruise.com on archive.org

EasyCruise (styled as easyCruise) was a cruise line of Greek ferry operator Hellenic Seaways. It was sold to them in August 2009 for £9 million by Cypriot/British business man, Stelios Haji-Ioannou, founder of easyGroup. They launched their first cruise ship EasyCruiseOne in 2005. Unlike other cruise lines, EasyCruise's business model offered passengers a no-frills vacation. EasyCruise ended operations in early 2010.

In December 2024, easyCruise became a cruise selling website.

== History ==
=== Foundation ===
Stelios Haji-Ioannou, who has a family background in shipping, decided to form a budget cruise line which he hoped would mirror the success of his low-cost airline, easyJet. In April 2004, the initial ship was acquired for an approach to cruising that was aimed at attracting younger customers who wished to spend the majority of their time on shore rather than on board a megaship. The ship would offer the barest of amenities, allowing very cheap prices to be advertised. Value would be added by charging separately for each service aboard which is normally included in the quoted price of other cruise liners. Given the minimal facilities on board, the ship would position from port to port at night or in the early morning as the passengers slept, in order to allow the maximum time in each port ashore.

After a few months of negotiation and refurbishment, the ship, formerly known as Neptune 2, was renamed EasyCruiseOne. On 9 May 2005, the ship finally left for her maiden voyage. The service began by operating night-time departures cruising in the Mediterranean. For the winter season EasyCruise cruised in the Caribbean. Until 17 August 2007, a second boat, EasyCruiseTwo, a converted river freighter, had a route around the Netherlands and Belgium, visiting the cities of Amsterdam, Rotterdam, Antwerp and Brussels.

=== Demise ===
In February 2008, EasyCruise made public their plans to sell the EasyCruise One due to "not having enough space", and replacing her with a ship of similar size to the EasyCruise Life.

In August 2009, the single-ship cruise line was sold to Greek ferry operator Hellenic Seaways for £9 million. EasyCruise's operations were quietly discontinued sometime in early 2010. Passengers who were booked on future cruises were refunded. Later that year, their sole ship was moved to Blue Ocean Cruises and briefly operated as the Ocean Life. It was later sold for scrap. The cruise line's website was totally abandoned with no mention of its discontinuation. Sometime around 2014, the abandoned website was removed and now redirects to the easy.com homepage.

== Former fleet ==
Ship	Built	In Service	Tonnage	Notes	Image
EasyCruiseOne	1990	2005-2008	4,077 GT	Scrapped in 2022.	
EasyCruiseTwo	1981	2006-2007	1,006 GT	Operated as a riverboat. It was franchised by EasyCruise in 2006. It ceased operations in August 2007 due to the financial situation of the owner.	
EasyCruise Life	1981	2008-2010	9,878 GT	Scrapped in 2014.	

== Trivia ==
- The fortunes of EasyCruise were tracked by a three series observational documentary called "Cruise with Stelios" produced by the British company Twofour, which was screened on Sky3 in the UK on Friday nights and in the US on The Travel Channel. The programme was also broadcast in Belgium (Flanders) as 'Cruiseline' on the public broadcaster 'één'.
