= Russian training ship Perekop =

Smolnyy-class training ship

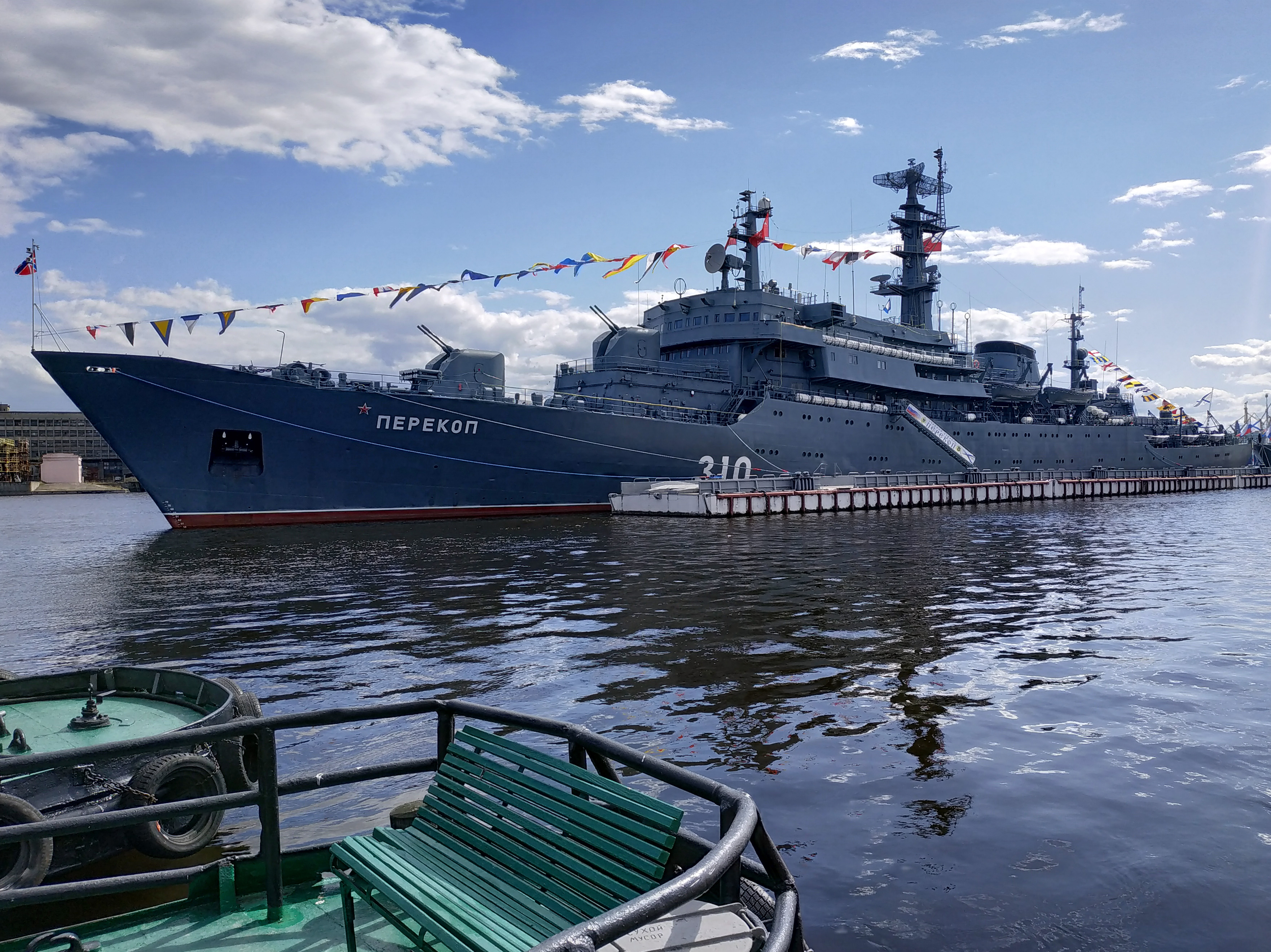
- Perekop on 8 May 2020

History

Russia
- Name: Perekop; (Перекоп)
- Namesake: Perekop
- Builder: Szczecin Shipyard, Szczecin
- Laid down: 24 April 1976
- Launched: 11 December 1976
- Commissioned: 30 September 1977
- Home port: Kronstadt
- Identification: Pennant number: 310
- Status: Active

General characteristics
- Class & type: Smolnyy-class training ship
- Displacement: 7270 tons full load
- Length: 138 m (453 ft)
- Beam: 17.2 m (56 ft)
- Draught: 5.53 m (18.1 ft)
- Propulsion: 2 shaft diesel, 16,000 hp (12,000 kW)
- Speed: 20 knots (37 km/h; 23 mph)
- Range: 9,000 nautical miles (17,000 km; 10,000 mi) at 14 knots (26 km/h; 16 mph)
- Complement: 132 + 30 Instructors + 300 cadets
- Sensors & processing systems: Radar: Angara-M/Head Net-C 3-D air search; Sonar: Shelon hull mounted MF
- Electronic warfare & decoys: Cat Watch intercept
- Armament: 4 × 76 mm (3 in) guns (2 twin turrets); 2 twin 30 mm anti-aircraft guns; 1 RBU-2500 ASW RL

Perekop is the second ship of the Smolnyy-class training ship of the Russian Navy.

== Development and design ==
The technical project 887 provided for a cruising range of 14 knots up to 9000 miles, a full speed of 20 knots with a standard displacement of 6,120 tons, as well as the placement of a training and production base with 30 teachers and 300 cadets on the ship.

The main power plant is mechanical, two-shaft with two diesel units 12ZV40 / 48 Zgoda Sulzer with a capacity of 8000 liters. from. each located in the MO. The units transmitted rotation through the side shafts to two four-bladed, low-noise variable-pitch propellers (RSh). The power plant is controlled remotely. The diesel is medium-speed, four-stroke, V-shaped, twelve-cylinder. The cylinder diameter is 400 mm, the piston stroke is 480 mm, the speed is 400–600 rpm. The total speed of the ship is 20 knots. The total fuel supply includes 1050 tons. Steam for domestic needs is generated by 2 auxiliary boilers of the "KVS" type.

== Construction and career ==
Perekop was laid down 24 April 1964 and launched on 11 December 1976 by Szczecin Shipyard at Szczecin. She was commissioned on 30 September 1977.

The ship made its first voyage around Europe in 1979.

From June to August 2008, he performed a long-distance training sea voyage around Europe.

As of September 23, 2017, the ship is in the Petrovskaya harbor of the port of Kronstadt.

On March 1, 2018, he left for a training campaign with the participation of cadets of the Naval Institute - Peter the Great Naval Corps. During the voyage, the ship visited four oceans and for the first time in its history passed the Northern Sea Route. Passed almost 22 thousand nautical miles, made eight business calls at foreign and Russian ports and participated in international exercises in the Pacific Ocean. The point of arrival is Vladivostok. The ship took part for the first time in the Exercise Komodo 2018 in Indonesia. Perekop as part of a tactical group worked out the issues of humanitarian aid, elimination of the consequences of catastrophes and natural disasters.

Since July 5, 2019, he made a long-distance navigational voyage across four oceans and along the Northern Sea Route, leaving more than 20 thousand nautical miles astern.

== Gallery ==
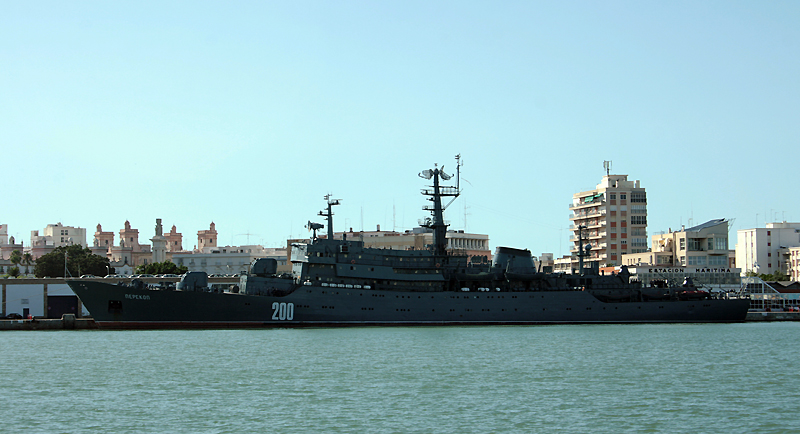
Perekop on 4 July 2008.

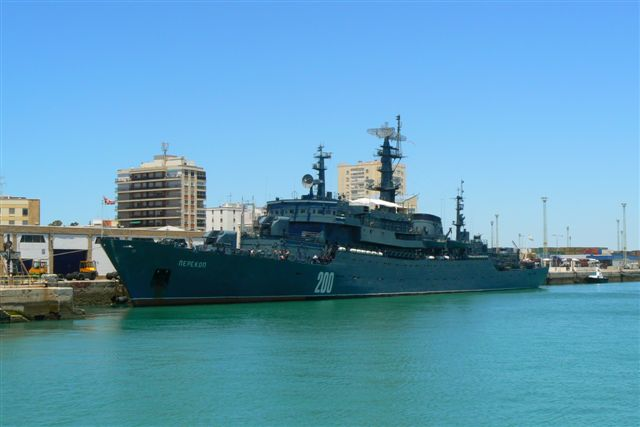
Perekop on 22 March 2009.

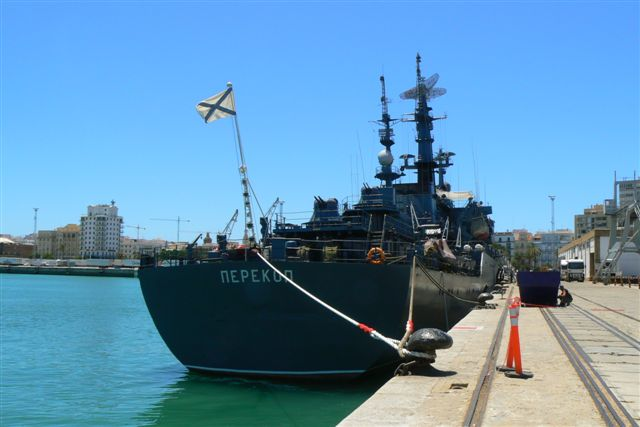
Perekop on 22 March 2009.

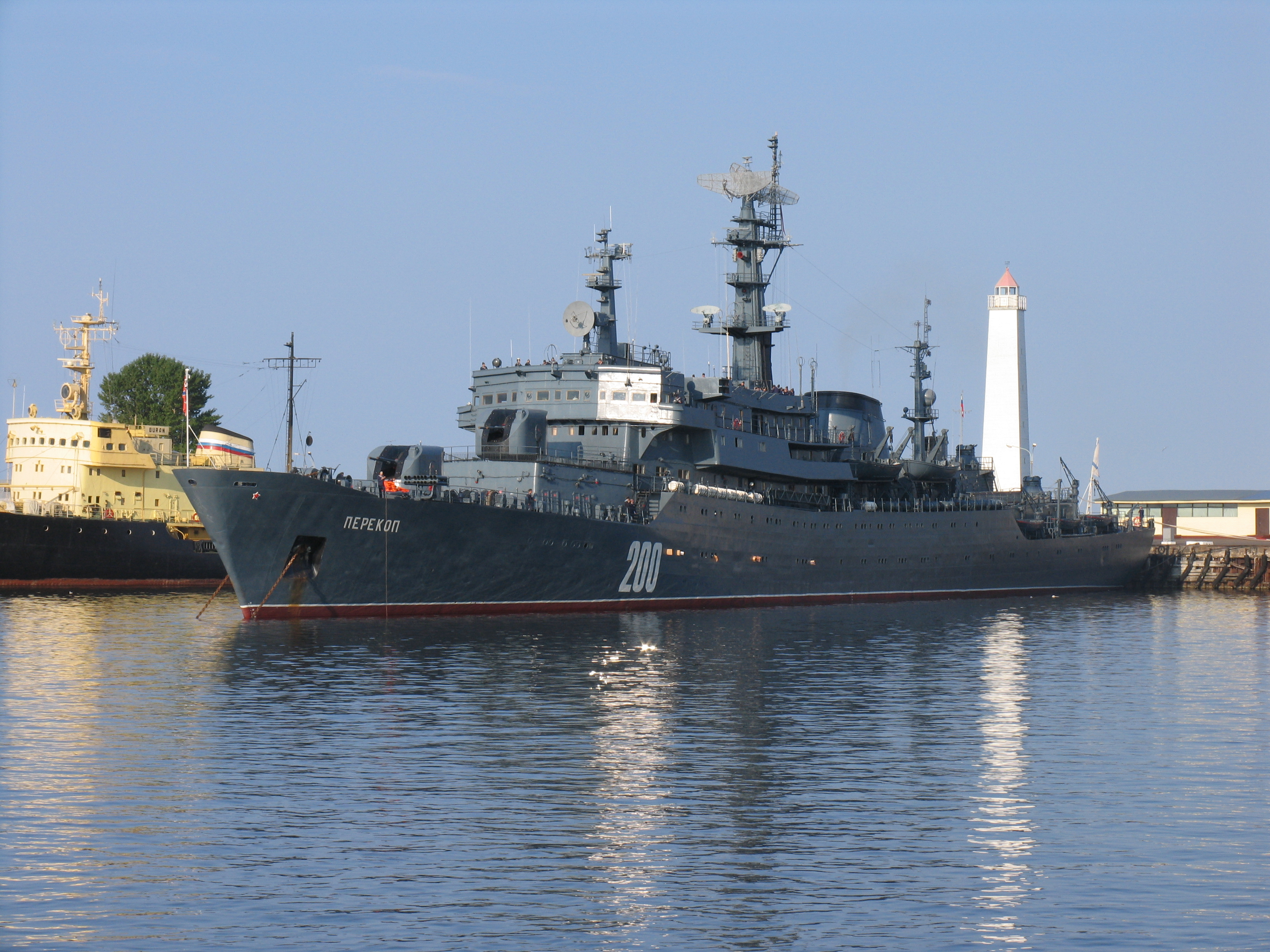
Perekop in Kronstadt on 12 August 2010.

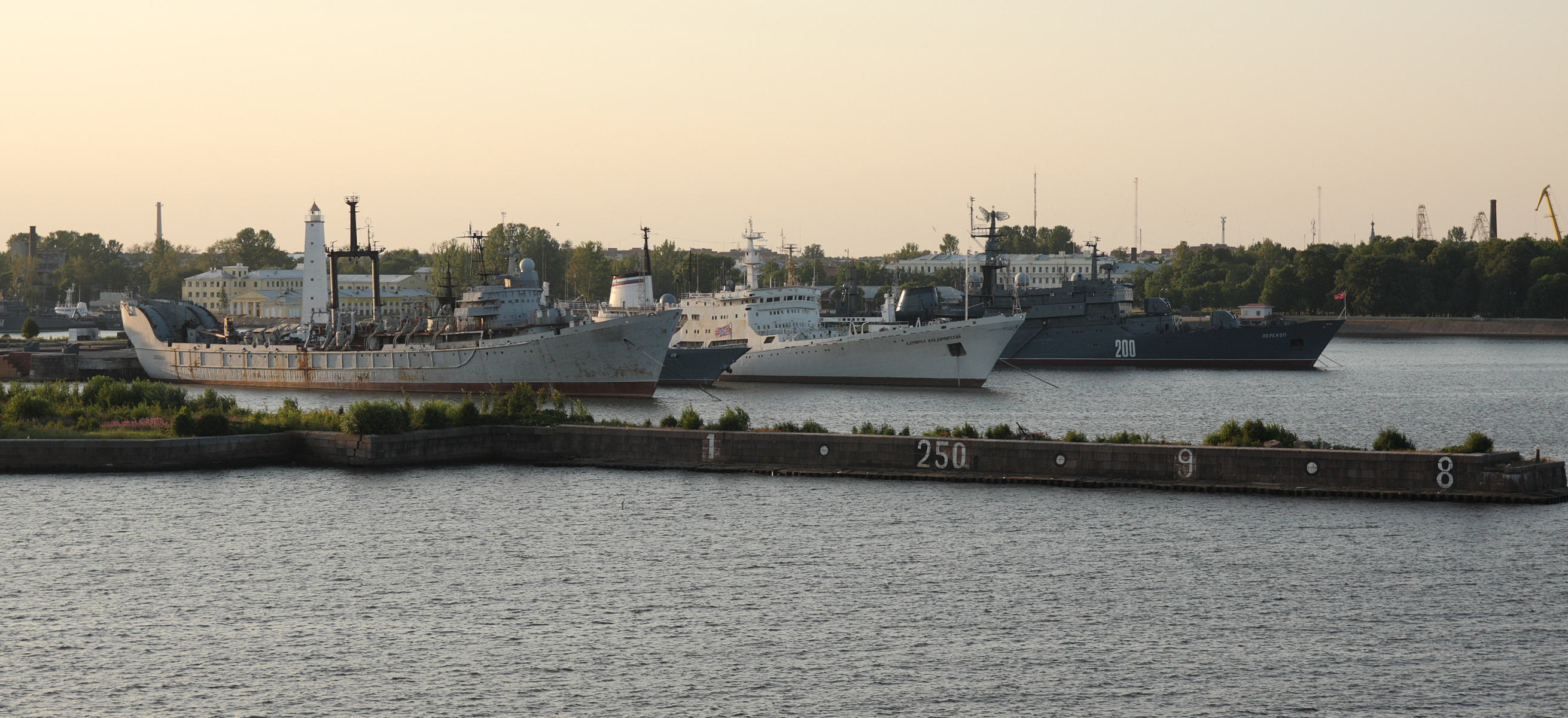
Perekop alongside Karpaty and Admiral Vladimirsky in Kronstadt on 18 July 2010.

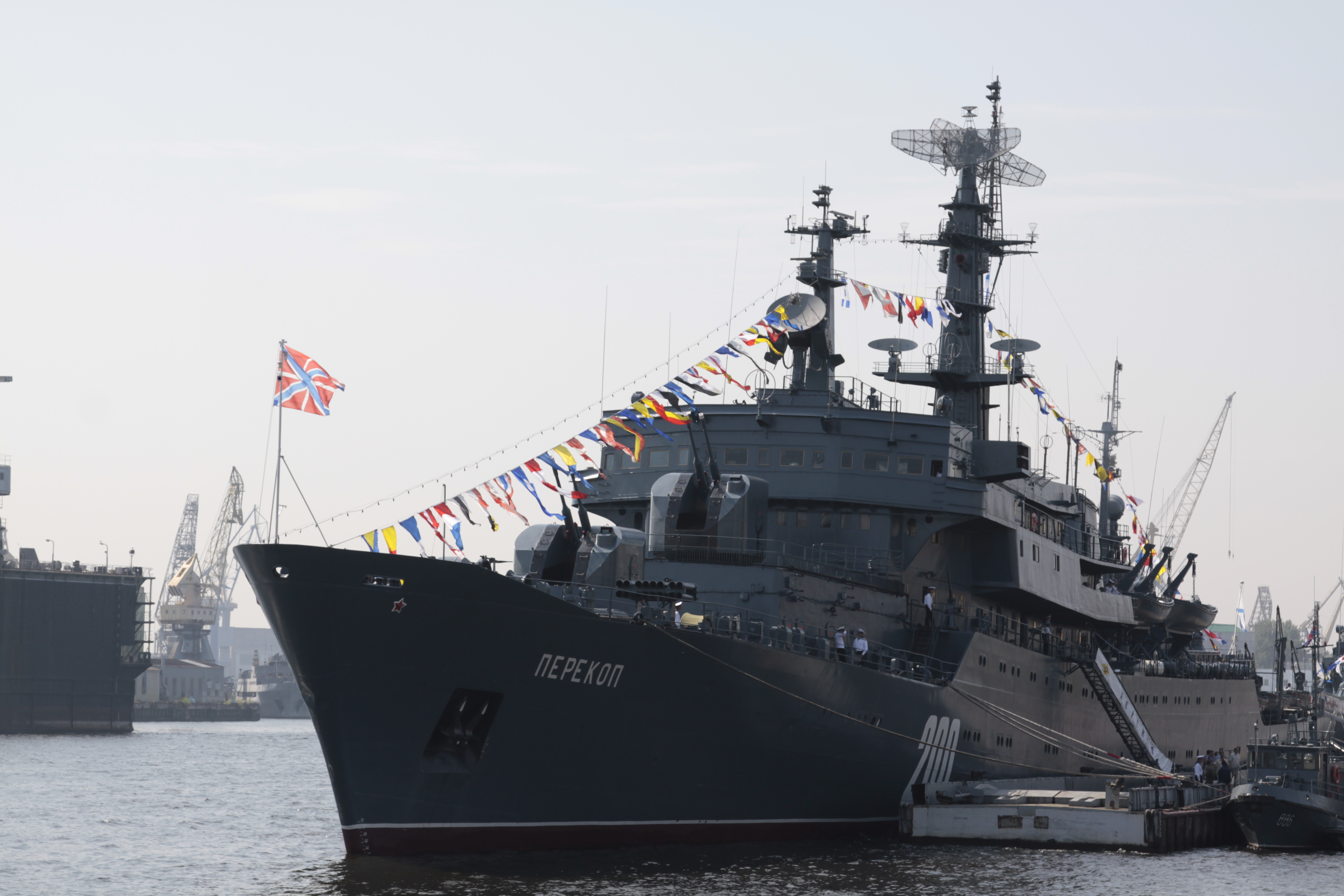
Perekop on 11 October 2011.

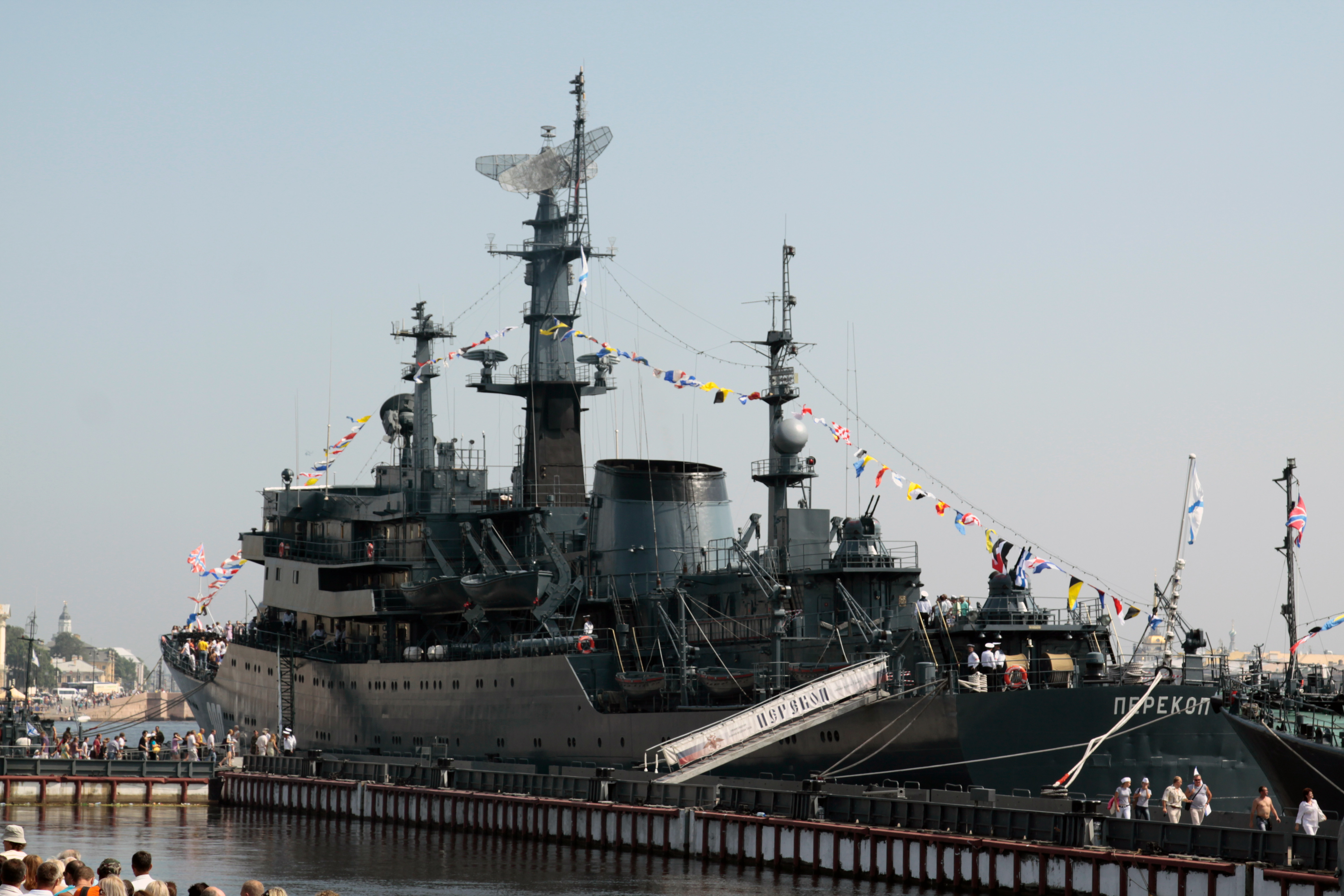
Perekop on 11 October 2011.

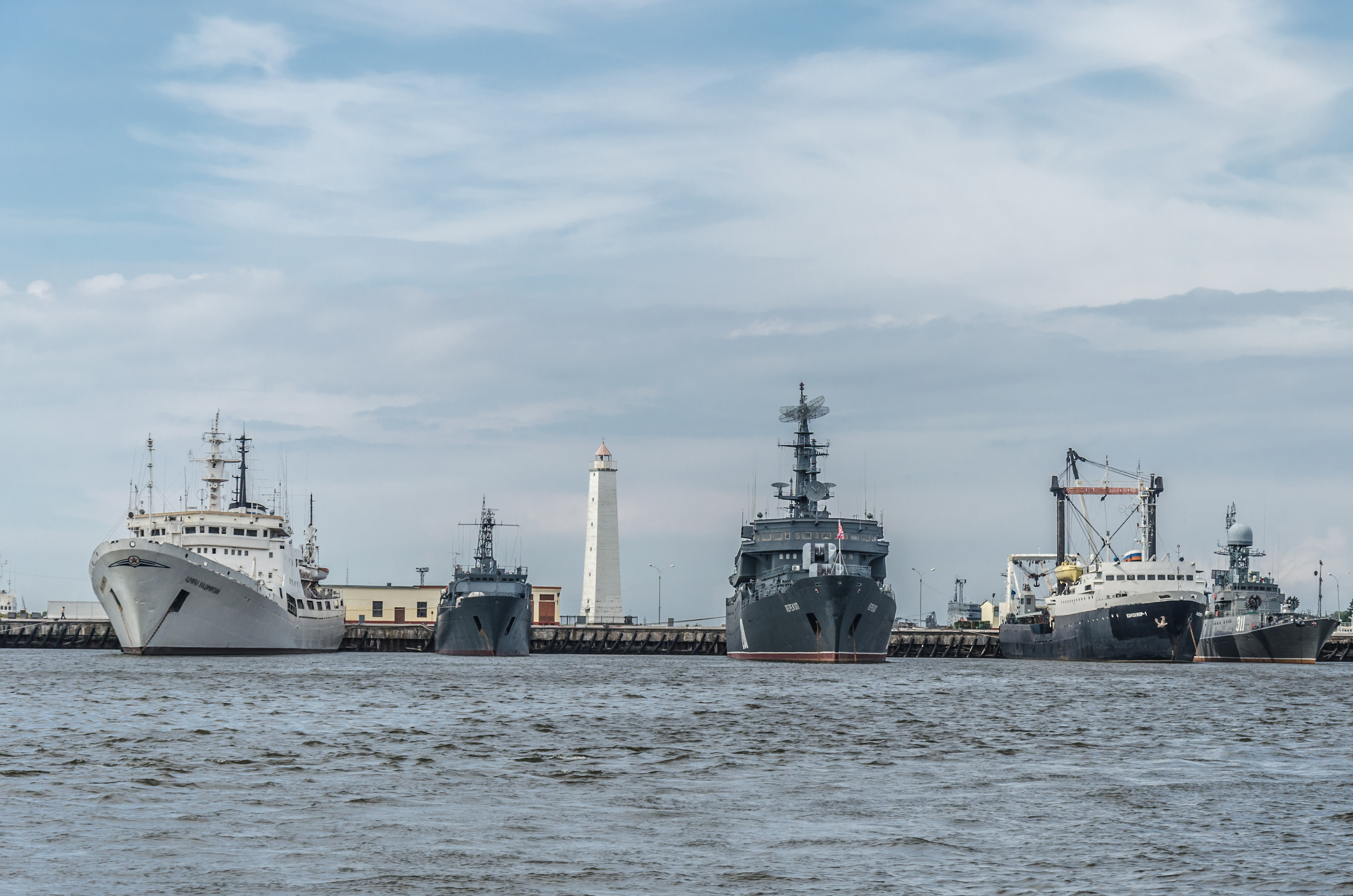
Perekop alongside Karpaty and Admiral Vladimirsky in Kronstadt on 5 August 2012.

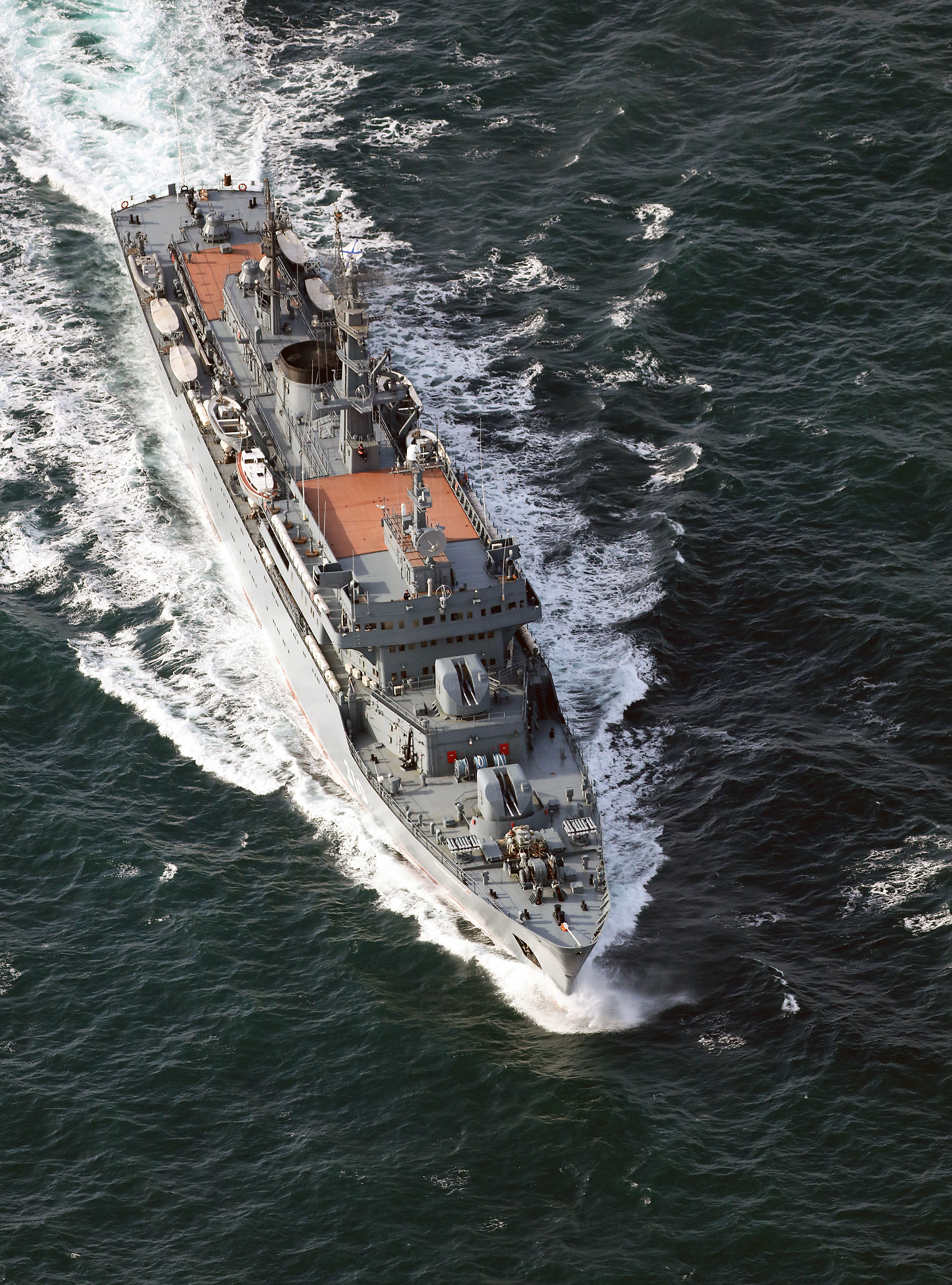
Perekop on 6 November 2018.

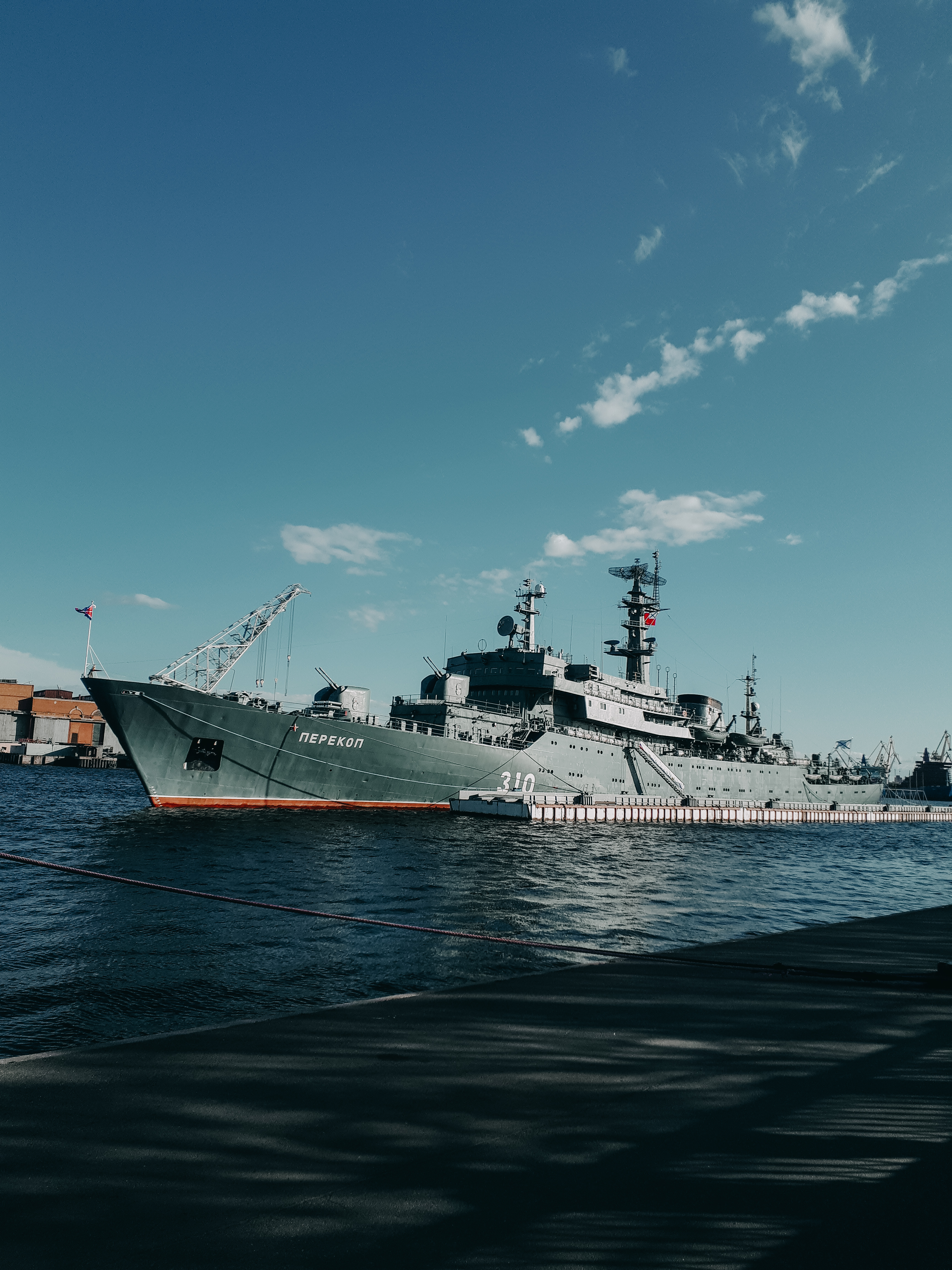
Perekop on 7 May 2020.
