= Harbel Tapper =

History

Liberia
- Name: Captain Osama
- Builder: Koyo Dockyard, Mihara, Japan
- Launched: 1981
- Completed: 1981
- In service: 1981
- Identification: IMO number: 7900596
- Status: In service

General characteristics
- Class & type: Bulk carrier
- Tonnage: 9,232 tons
- Length: 142 m (466 ft)
- Beam: 22 m (72 ft)
- Draught: 6.3 m (21 ft)

The Bulk carrier Harbel Tapper was launched on 20 March 1981 from the Koyo Dockyard, Mihara, Japan.Harbel Tapper was operated by L&C Shipping Lines, the dedicated shipping service of Firestone Natural Rubber Company. The ship, along with its sister ship the Harbel Cutlass, provided the only direct shipping service between Liberia and the United States. The ship typically completed six round-trip voyages a year, carrying both bulk liquid and dry cargo. On trips to the U.S., the ship carried liquid latex and block rubber. To Liberia and West Africa, the ship carried rice, medical supplies, vehicles, equipment, fertilizer and all the other supplies needed to support Firestone Liberia operations, as well as third party cargo. Harbel Tapper unloaded directly into terminals in Fall River, Massachusetts; Baltimore; and Savannah, Georgia. In addition, the ship also called at the ports of Norfolk, Virginia, and Lake Charles, Louisiana, where it then loaded rice for West Africa.

Since 2011 it has been renamed as Captain Osama.

== Events ==
In 1983 Harbel Tapper was involved in a ship collision with the United States passenger vessel MV Yankee in Rhode Island Sound.

In 1986 Harbel Tapper appeared briefly on-screen in the Hollywood film The Mosquito Coast starring Harrison Ford.

In September 2000 Harbel Tapper was involved in a ship collision with the Greece registered tanker Olympic Breeze in the Gulf of Mexico, both vessels sustaining damage.

Harbel Tapper's last journey in 2011 was to take part in the humanitarian relief shipment to earthquake-devastated Haiti coordinated by the Firestone Natural Rubber Company, LLC (FSNR) teammates and the vessel crew. During this mission, the ship had to survive an attack by pirates and an outbreak of cholera that afflicted the island at the time.

Harbel Tapper then returned to its home port of Monrovia in Liberia where it was temporarily retired. Harbel Tapper's sister ship Harbel Cutlass continues in active service.

In 2011 Harbel Tapper was re-badged as 'Captain Osama' under the ownership of A.N.Brother Maritime Co SA, sailing under the flag of Tasmania.
