= Zelenodolsk, Russia =

Zelenodolsk (Russian: Зеленодольск) is the name of several inhabited localities in Russia.

Urban localities

- Zelenodolsk, Republic of Tatarstan, a town in the Republic of Tatarstan

Rural localities

- Zelenodolsk, Orenburg Oblast, a selo in Zelenodolsky Selsoviet of Kvarkensky District in Orenburg Oblast
- Zelenodolsk, Sakhalin Oblast, a selo in Anivsky District of Sakhalin Oblast
