= Szczecin Shipyard =

Former shipyard in Poland

Stocznia Szczecińska Nowa Sp. z o.o.
- Industry: Shipbuilding
- Founded: 1948 (as Stocznia Szczecińska)
- Headquarters: Szczecin, Poland
- Services: Shipbuilding; Ship repair
- Website: http://stocznia-szczecinska.pl/en/

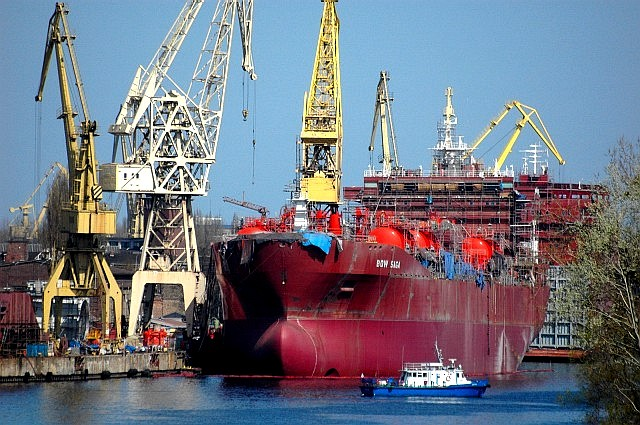
Szczecin Shipyard in Szczecin, Poland

Szczecin Shipyard or New Szczecin Shipyard (Polish: Stocznia Szczecińska Nowa) was a shipyard in the city of Szczecin, Poland. Formerly known as Stocznia Szczecińska Porta Holding S.A. (until 2002) or Stocznia im. Adolfa Warskiego. The shipyard specialized in the construction of container ships, Chemical tankers, multi-purpose vessels and ConRo ships. It employed about 4400 people, and the executive director was Andrzej Markowski. It was ISO 9001:2000 certified.

== History ==
It was founded in the aftermath of World War II, when the German port of Stettin was taken over by Poland and renamed Szczecin. The state-owned shipyard then inherited the assets of the former German shipbuilding giant AG Vulcan Stettin.

In the 1970s and 1980s, the shipyard was one of the most important centers of anticommunist resistance in Poland (see: Polish 1970 protests, Solidarity).

It was the 5th biggest shipyard in Europe and the 40th in the world.

In 2009, the Polish government contracted the sale of Szczecin Shipyard and Gdynia shipyards to QInvest of Qatar. However, by September the deal fell apart, and the government started looking for new investors.

== Szczecin Industrial Park ==
Since 2009, Szczecin Industrial Park (Stocznia Szczecińska) has been created on the site of the former Szczecin Shipyard in the north-east of Szczecin. The 45-hectare site, about two kilometres from the city centre is well equipped shipbuilding and ship repair, with 3 slipways (Wulkan Nowy, Odra Nowa and Wulkan Stary), 750 m of quays, 80 000 sqm of prefabrication yards and over 10 ha of warehouses. The assets are owned by MARS Closed Investment Fund.

== The type and number of units produced until 1998 ==
Ships built until 1998
No.	Type	Number of projects	Number of vessels passed	DWT (in total)
1	Bulk carrier	11	79	2181,3
2	Cargo ship	1	41	130,2
3	General cargo ship	17	143	1156,6
4	Szkolno-towarowy	1	13	71,6
5	Semikontenerowiec	4	25	382,3
6	Container ship	7	97	1701,8
7	Chemical tanker	2	13	342,5
8	Produktowiec	4	11	400,3
9	Cargo-passenger	4	17	97,1
10	Ferry	3	11	17,9
11	Road ferry	1	4	3,2
12	Scientific research	2	12	16.5
13	Geophysical	1	9	11,8
14	Research vessel	2	17	96,6
15	Hospital ship	1	4	13,6
16	Repair ship	4	40	185,4
17	Powership	1	4	24,6
18	Anchor handling tug supply vessel	2	48	66,3
19	Crane vessel 40t	1	4	1,1
20	Container crane 300t	1	1	1,6
21	Rocket-artillery training ship	1	3	21,9
22	Landing craft	1	1	4,5
Total		71	597	6928,8
