= List of ship launches in 1979 =

The list of ship launches in 1979 includes a chronological list of all ships launched in 1979.

Date	Ship	Class / type	Builder	Location	Country	Notes
20 January	Deyo	Spruance-class destroyer	Ingalls Shipbuilding	Pascagoula, Mississippi	United States	
27 January	Elstree Grange	Tanker	Harland & Wolff	Belfast	United Kingdom	For Furness Withy.
27 January	Yellowstone	Yellowstone-class destroyer tender	National Steel & Shipbuilding	San Diego, California	United States	
3 February	City of Hartlepool	Container ship	Appledore Shipbuilders Ltd.	Appledore	United Kingdom	For Container Rentals Ltd.
3 February	Thorn	Spruance-class destroyer	Ingalls Shipbuilding	Pascagoula, Mississippi	United States	
9 February	Searcher		Brooke Marine Ltd.	Lowestoft	United Kingdom	For HM Coastguard.
15 February	Fremantle	Fremantle-class patrol boat	Brooke Marine	Lowestoft, Suffolk	United Kingdom	For Royal Australian Navy.
10 March	Ingersoll	Spruance-class destroyer	Ingalls Shipbuilding	Pascagoula, Mississippi	United States	
20 March	Pontos	Type 209 submarine	Howaldtswerke-Deutsche Werft	Kiel	West Germany	For Greek Navy.
24 March	Clark	Oliver Hazard Perry-class frigate	Bath Iron Works	Bath, Maine	United States	
25 March	Zadornyy	Project 1135 large anti-submarine ship	Yantar	Kaliningrad	Soviet Union	
27 March	Antrim	Oliver Hazard Perry-class frigate	Todd Pacific Shipyards	Seattle, Washington	United States	
27 March	Yūshio	Yūshio-class submarine			Japan	
31 March	Diana II	Roll-on/roll-off passenger car ferry	Meyer Werft	Papenburg	West Germany	For Rederi AB Slite for Viking Line traffic
7 April	Ohio	Ohio-class submarine	Electric Boat	Groton, Connecticut	United States	
21 April	Sokol	Koni-class frigate	Zelenodolsk Shipyard	Zelenodolsk	Soviet Union	For Soviet Navy.
25 April	Mercandian Carrier	type FV 610 RoRo-ship	Frederikshavn Vaerft	Frederikshavn	Denmark	For Merc-Scandia KS
28 April	Dallas	Los Angeles-class submarine	Electric Boat	Groton, Connecticut	United States	
28 April	Cimarron	Cimarron-class fleet replenishment oiler	Avondale Shipyard	Avondale, Louisiana	United States	
1 May	Fife	Spruance-class destroyer	Ingalls Shipbuilding	Pascagoula, Mississippi	United States	
9 May	City of Ipswich	Container ship	Appledore Shipbuilders Ltd.	Appledore	United Kingdom	For Container Rentals Ltd.
19 May	Sides	Oliver Hazard Perry-class frigate	Todd Pacific Shipyards	San Pedro, California	United States	
24 May	Galloway Princess	Ferry	Harland & Wolff	Belfast	United Kingdom	For Sealink.
7 June	Thomas F. Doyle	Tug	Arklow Engineering Co Ltd.	Wexford	Ireland	For Cork Harbour Commissioners.
16 June	Fletcher	Spruance-class destroyer	Ingalls Shipbuilding	Pascagoula, Mississippi	United States	
29 June	Southampton	Type 42 destroyer	Vosper Thornycroft	Southampton, England	United Kingdom	
14 July	Samuel Eliot Morison	Oliver Hazard Perry-class frigate	Bath Iron Works	Bath, Maine	United States	
28 July	Acadia	Yellowstone-class destroyer tender	National Steel & Shipbuilding	San Diego, California	United States	
20 July	Yıldıray	Type 209 submarine	Marinewerft	Gölcük	Turkey	For Turkish Navy
27 July	Seeker	Revenue cutter	Brooke Marine Ltd.	Lowestoft	United Kingdom	For HM Customs and Excise.
11 August	Kidd	Kidd-class destroyer	Ingalls Shipbuilding	Pascagoula, Mississippi	United States	
11 August	La Jolla	Los Angeles-class submarine	Electric Boat	Groton, Connecticut	United States	
14 August	Rosella	Cruiseferry	Wärtsilä Turku Shipyard	Turku	Finland	For SF Line for Viking Line traffic
18 August	Mercandian Exporter II	type FV 610 RoRo-ship	Frederikshavn Vaerft	Frederikshavn	Denmark	For Per Henriksen.
24 August	Fahrion	Oliver Hazard Perry-class frigate	Todd Pacific Shipyards	Seattle, Washington	United States	
30 August	Casma	Type 209 submarine	Howaldtswerke-Deutsche Werft	Kiel	West Germany	For Peruvian Navy
7 September	Ravenscraig	Bulk carrier	Harland & Wolff	Belfast	United Kingdom	For British Steel Corporation.
10 September	Star Hercules	Offshore supply vessel	Appledore Shipbuilders Ltd.	Appledore	United Kingdom	For Ratchden Ltd.
11 September	Viking Sally	Roll-on/roll-off passenger car ferry	Meyer Werft	Papenburg	West Germany	Originally ordered by an unknown Norwegian company. Contract transferred to Rederi Ab Sally.
20 September	Kurama	Shirane-class destroyer			Japan	
21 September	Prairial	Batillus-class supertanker	Chantiers de l'Atlantique	Saint-Nazaire, France	France	
24 September	New Zealand Caribbean	container ship	Bremer Vulkan	Bremen-Vegesack	West Germany	For Shipping Corporation of New Zealand Ltd.
27 September	Bremen	Bremen-class frigate	Bremer Vulkan	Bremen-Vegesack	West Germany	For German Navy
5 October	Splendid	Swiftsure-class submarine	Vickers Shipbuilding and Engineering		United Kingdom	
20 October	John A. Moore	Oliver Hazard Perry-class frigate	Todd Pacific Shipyards	San Pedro, California	United States	
27 October	San Francisco	Los Angeles-class submarine	Newport News Shipbuilding	Newport News, Virginia	United States	
3 November	Estocin	Oliver Hazard Perry-class frigate	Bath Iron Works	Bath, Maine	United States	
4 November	Ever Light	Ever Level-class container ship	Onomichi Zosen	Onomichi	Japan	For Evergreen Marine
10 November	Georg Ots	Dmitriy Shostakovich-class ferry	Stocznia Szczecinska im Adolfa Warskiego Warskiego	Szczecin	Poland	For Black Sea Shipping Company
15 November	Peroto	Coaster	Bideford Shipyard (1973) Ltd	Bideford	United Kingdom	For Cornish Shipping Ltd.
1 December	Callaghan	Kidd-class destroyer	Ingalls Shipbuilding	Pascagoula, Mississippi	United States	
5 December	St Anselm	Ferry	Harland & Wolff	Belfast	United Kingdom	For Sealink.
8 December	Phoenix	Los Angeles-class submarine	Electric Boat	Groton, Connecticut	United States	
19 December	Antofagasta	Type 209 submarine	Howaldtswerke-Deutsche Werft	Kiel	West Germany	For Peruvian Navy
29 December	Dmitriy Shostakovich	Dmitriy Shostakovich-class ferry	Stocznia Szczecinska im Adolfa Warskiego Warskiego	Szczecin	Poland	For Black Sea Shipping Company
Unknown date	Lady Sarah	Fishing vessel	David Abels Boatbuilders Ltd.	Bristol	United Kingdom	For private owner.
