= List of ship launches in 1982 =

The list of ship launches in 1982 includes a chronological list of all ships launched in 1982.

Date	Ship	Class / type	Builder	Location	Country	Notes
8 January	Karlsruhe	Bremen-class frigate	Howaldtswerke	Kiel	West Germany	For German Navy
23 January	Isomeria	LPG carrier	Harland & Wolff	Belfast	United Kingdom	For Shell Tankers Ltd.
28 January	Espora	Espora-class corvette	Río Santiago Shipyard	La Plata	Argentina	For Argentine Navy.
30 January	Platte	Cimarron-class fleet replenishment oiler	Avondale Shipyard	Avondale, Louisiana	United States	For United States Navy.
3 February	Mercandian Governor	Type FV 1500 RoRo-ship	Frederikshavn Værft	Frederikshavn	Denmark	For K/S Merc Scandia XXIX.
6 February	Shenandoah	Yellowstone-class destroyer tender	National Steel and Shipbuilding	San Diego, California	United States	For United States Navy.
6 February	Underwood	Oliver Hazard Perry-class frigate	Bath Iron Works	Bath, Maine	United States	For United States Navy.
17 February	Heroína	Almirante Brown-class destroyer	Blohm + Voss	Hamburg	West Germany	For Argentine Navy
19 February	Carrianna Peony	B26-class Bulk Carrier	Austin & Pickersgill Ltd	Sunderland	Panama	For Pino Armadora S.A.
22 February	Yubari	Yubari-class destroyer escort			Japan	For Japan Maritime Self-Defense Force.
26 February	Wimpy Seahunter	Offshore supply vessel	Appledore Shipbuilders Ltd.	Appledore	United Kingdom	For Wimpey (Marine) Ltd.
2 March	Hayler	Spruance-class destroyer	Ingalls Shipbuilding	Pascagoula, Mississippi	United States	For United States Navy.
5 March	Okishio	Yūshio-class submarine			Japan	For Japan Maritime Self-Defense Force.
6 March	Curts	Oliver Hazard Perry-class frigate	Todd Pacific Shipyards	San Pedro, California	United States	For United States Navy.
13 March	Albuquerque	Los Angeles-class submarine	Electric Boat	Groton, Connecticut	United States	For United States Navy.
26 March	Darwin	Adelaide-class frigate	Todd Pacific Shipyards	Seattle, Washington	United States	For Royal Australian Navy.
30 April	Mercandian President	Type FV 1500 RoRo-ship	Frederikshavn Værft	Frederikshavn	Denmark	For K/S Merc Scandia XXIX.
8 May	Buffalo	Los Angeles-class submarine	Newport News Shipbuilding	Newport News, Virginia	United States	For United States Navy.
8 May	Beaver	Type 22 frigate	Yarrow Shipbuilders	Glasgow, Scotland	United Kingdom	For Royal Navy.
22 May	Doyle	Oliver Hazard Perry-class frigate	Bath Iron Works	Bath, Maine	United States	For United States Navy.
22 May	Príncipe de Asturias	V/STOL aircraft carrier	Bazán	Ferrol	Spain	For Spanish Navy.
27 May	Hamayuki	Hatsuyuki-class destroyer			Japan	For Japan Maritime Self-Defense Force.
19 June	Echoman	Tanker	Appledore Shipbuilders Ltd.	Appledore	United Kingdom	For Rowbotham Tankships Ltd.
20 June	York	Type 42 destroyer	Swan Hunter	Wallsend	United Kingdom	For Royal Navy.
21 June	Sawayuki	Hatsuyuki-class destroyer			Japan	For Japan Maritime Self-Defense Force.
23 June	Inflexible	Redoutable-class submarine	DCNS	Cherbourg	France	For French Navy.
3 July	British Skill	Tanker	Harland & Wolff	Belfast	United Kingdom	For BP.
31 July	SKR-471	Koni-class frigate	Werft 4340	Zelenodolsk	Soviet Union	For Soviet Navy.
27 August	Bussewitz	Tanker	Howaldtswerke-Deutsche Werft	Kiel	West Germany	For Deutsche Seereederei Rostock
31 August	Sarandi	Almirante Brown-class destroyer	Blohm + Voss	Hamburg	West Germany	For Argentine Navy
18 September	Klakring	Oliver Hazard Perry-class frigate	Bath Iron Works	Bath, Maine	United States	For United States Navy.
18 September	McClusky	Oliver Hazard Perry-class frigate	Todd Pacific Shipyards	San Pedro, California	United States	For United States Navy.
18 September	Portsmouth	Los Angeles-class submarine	Electric Boat	Groton, Connecticut	United States	For United States Navy.
8 October	Montero	Lupo-class frigate	Servicio Industrial de la Marina	Callao	Peru	For Peruvian Navy.
15 October	Vandegrift	Oliver Hazard Perry-class frigate	Todd Pacific Shipyards	Seattle, Washington	United States	For United States Navy.
16 October	Salt Lake City	Los Angeles-class submarine	Newport News Shipbuilding	Newport News, Virginia	United States	For United States Navy.
19 October	Mineyuki	Hatsuyuki-class destroyer			Japan	For Japan Maritime Self-Defense Force.
28 October	Tankerman	Tanker	Appledore Shipbuilders Ltd.	Appledore	United Kingdom	For Rowbotham Tankships Ltd.
2 November	Gloucester	Type 42 destroyer	Vosper Thorneycroft	Woolston, Hampshire	United Kingdom	For Royal Navy.
5 November	Mercandian Ambassador II	Type FV 1500 RoRo-ship	Frederikshavn Værft	Frederikshavn	Denmark	For K/S Merc-Scandia XXXII P/R.
6 November	Georgia	Ohio-class submarine	Electric Boat	Groton, Connecticut	United States	For United States Navy.
13 November	Norilsk	SA-15 type cargo ship	Wärtsilä	Turku	Finland	
1 December	Turbulent	Trafalgar-class submarine	Vickers Shipbuilding	Barrow-in-Furness	United Kingdom	For Royal Navy.
18 December	De Wert	Oliver Hazard Perry-class frigate	Bath Iron Works	Bath, Maine	United States	For United States Navy.
18 December	Thach	Oliver Hazard Perry-class frigate	Todd Pacific Shipyards	San Pedro, California	United States	For United States Navy.
Unknown date	El Yadekh	Patrol boat	Brooke Marine Ltd.	Lowestoft	United Kingdom	For Algerian Navy.
Unknown date	Kingroad	Workboat	David Abels Boatbuilders Ltd.	Bristol	United Kingdom	For Bristol Ports Authority.
Unknown date	Mainscrew	Tug	David Abels Boatbuilders Ltd.	Bristol	United Kingdom	For Mayhew Marine.
Unknown date	Peter Faber	Cable-laying vessel			Denmark	
Unknown date	Pride of Bath	Passenger Launch	David Abels Boatbuilders Ltd.	Bristol	United Kingdom	For private owner.
Unknown date	Rachel Ann	Launch	David Abels Boatbuilders Ltd.	Bristol	United Kingdom	For private owner.
Unknown date	Stent I	Tug	David Abels Boatbuilders Ltd.	Bristol	United Kingdom	For private owner.
Unknown date	Ugor	Auxiliary ammunition ship			Yugoslavia	For Yugoslav Navy
