= List of ship launches in 1988 =

The list of ship launches in 1988 includes a chronological list of all ships launched in 1988.

Date	Ship	Class / type	Builder	Location	Country	Notes
15 January	Comstock	Whidbey Island-class dock landing ship	Avondale Shipyard	Avondale, Louisiana	United States	
20 January	Chatham	Type 22 frigate	Swan Hunter	Wallsend	United Kingdom	
23 January	Topeka	Los Angeles-class submarine	Electric Boat	Groton, Connecticut	United States	
23 January	Quorn	Hunt-class mine countermeasures vessel	Vosper Thornycroft	Woolston	United Kingdom	
13 February	Abraham Lincoln	Nimitz-class aircraft carrier	Newport News Shipbuilding	Newport News, Virginia	United States	
17 February	Sachishio	Yūshio-class submarine			Japan	
17 March	Royal Viking Sun	Cruise ship	Wärtsilä Marine Perno shipyard	Turku	Finland	For Royal Viking Line
18 March	Arco Adur	Dredger	Appledore Ferguson Shipbuilders Ltd	Appledore	United Kingdom	For Hanson Aggregates Marine Ltd.
19 March	Normandy	Ticonderoga-class cruiser	Bath Iron Works	Bath, Maine	United States	
19 March	Latouche-Tréville	Georges Leygues-class frigate			France	
15 April	Talent	Trafalgar-class submarine	Vickers Shipbuilding	Barrow-in-Furness	United Kingdom	
22 April	Schleswig-Holstein	ferry	Husumer Schiffswerft GmbH	Husum	West Germany	For Wyker Dampfschiffs-Reederei Föhr-Amrum GmbH
23 April	Pennsylvania	Ohio-class submarine	Electric Boat	Groton, Connecticut	United States	
30 April	Halifax	Halifax-class frigate	Saint John Shipbuilding	Saint John, New Brunswick	Canada	
30 April	Eversand		C. Lühring	Brake	West Germany	For German Navy
30 April	Zander	Zander-class tug	VEB Yachtwerft Berlin		East Germany	For Volksmarine
4 June	Hamagiri	Asagiri-class destroyer			Japan	
25 June	Ingraham	Oliver Hazard Perry-class frigate	Todd Pacific Shipyards	San Pedro, California	United States	
15 July	Chancellorsville	Ticonderoga-class cruiser	Ingalls Shipbuilding	Pascagoula, Mississippi	United States	
22 July	Yıldırım	Yavuz-class frigate	Gölcük Naval Shipyard		Turkey	
31 July	Omskiy-133	Omskiy type cargo ship	Șantierul Naval Oltenița	Oltenița	Soviet Union	For North Western Fleet Company
8 August	Dolunay	Type 209 submarine	Marinewerft	Gölcük	Turkey	For Turkish Naval Forces
13 August	Isabella	cruiseferry	Brodogradevna Industrija	Split, Yugoslavia	Yugoslavia	For SF Line for Viking Line traffic
15 August	Benjamin Isherwood	Henry J. Kaiser-class replenishment oiler	Pennsylvania Shipbuilding Company	Philadelphia, Pennsylvania	United States	
1 September	Stollergrund	Stollengrund-class multipurpose boats	Kröger Shipyard	Schacht-Audorf	West Germany	For German Navy
12 September	Setogiri	Asagiri-class destroyer			Japan	
15 September	Tortuga	Whidbey Island-class dock landing ship	Avondale Shipyard	Avondale, Louisiana	United States	
22 October	Athena	cruiseferry	Wärtsilä Marine Perno shipyard	Turku, Finland	Finland	For Rederi AB Slite for Viking Line traffic
23 October	Monterey	Ticonderoga-class cruiser	Bath Iron Works	Bath, Maine	United States	
11 November	Mercandia VII	Ferry	Appledore Ferguson Shipbuilders Ltd	Appledore	United Kingdom	For Mercandia Liniere I/S.
12 November	Miami	Los Angeles-class submarine	Electric Boat	Groton, Connecticut	United States	
19 November	Foudre	Foudre-class landing platform dock	DCN	Brest	France	For French Navy
3 December	Leroy Grumman	Henry J. Kaiser-class replenishment oiler	Avondale Shipyard	Avondale, Louisiana	United States	
4 December	Riga	Kuznetsov-class aircraft carrier		Mykolaiv	Soviet Union	Renamed Varyag in 1990, transferred to PLAN in 1998
21 December	Abukuma	Abukuma-class destroyer escort			Japan	
25 December	Sawagiri	Asagiri-class destroyer			Japan	
Unknown date	Aran	Workboat	David Abels Boatbuilders Ltd.	Bristol	United Kingdom	For private owner.
Unknown date	Harvest Reaper	Fishing trawler	David Abels Boatbuilders Ltd.	Bristol	United Kingdom	For private owner.
Unknown date	Konarak	Hendijan-class vessel	K Damen	Boven-Hardinxveld	Netherlands	For Islamic Republic of Iran Navy
Unknown date	Maid of the Forth	Ferry	David Abels Boatbuilders Ltd.	Bristol	United Kingdom	For private owner.
Unknown date	Miss Westmorland	Ferry	David Abels Boatbuilders Ltd.	Bristol	United Kingdom	For Windermere Lake Cruises.
Unknown date	Pill Hobbler	Launch	David Abels Boatbuilders Ltd.	Bristol	United Kingdom	For Pill Hobbler Marine Services Ltd.
Unknown date	Purbeck Gem	Passenger ship	J. Bolson & Son Ltd.	Poole	United Kingdom	For Robert A. Hale.
Unknown date	Surta	Steam launch	David Abels Boatbuilders Ltd.	Bristol	United Kingdom	For private owner.
