= List of ship launches in 1987 =

The list of ship launches in 1987 includes a chronological list of all ships launched in 1987.

Date	Ship	Class / type	Builder	Location	Country	Notes
17 January	Andrew J. Higgins	Henry J. Kaiser-class replenishment oiler	Avondale Shipyard	Avondale, Louisiana	United States	
23 January	Yukishio	Yūshio-class submarine			Japan	
29 January	Numancia	Santa María-class frigate	Bazan	Ferrol	Spain	
30 January	Shimakaze	Hatakaze-class destroyer	Mitsubishi Heavy Industries		Japan	
30 January	Vogelsand	Nordstand-class tug	Orenstein & Koppel	Lübeck	West Germany	
25 February	San Giorgio	San Giorgio-class amphibious transport dock	Fincantieri		Italy	
7 March	Mozart	River cruise ship	Deggendorfer Werft und Eisenbau		West Germany	For Donaudampfschiffahrtsgesellschaft
3 April	Lake Champlain	Ticonderoga-class cruiser	Ingalls Shipbuilding	Pascagoula, Mississippi	United States	
4 April	Sovereign of the Seas	Sovereign-class cruise ship	Chantiers de l'Atlantique	Saint-Nazaire	France	For Royal Caribbean International
10 April	Arco Arun	Dredger	Appledore Ferguson Shipbuilders Ltd	Appledore	United Kingdom	For Hanson Aggregates Marine Ltd.
24 April	Fatih	Yavuz-class frigate	Gölcük Naval Shipyard		Turkey	
24 April	Atair	Vermessungs-, Wracksuch- und Forschungsschiffe des BSH	Kröger-Werft	Schacht-Audorf	West Germany	For Federal Ministry of Transport and Digital Infrastructure
28 April	Tupi	Type 209 submarine	Howaldtswerke-Deutsche Werft	Kiel	West Germany	For Marinha do Brasil
3 May	SKR-451	Koni-class frigate	Werft 340	Zelenodolsk	Soviet Union	For Soviet Navy
9 May	Kronsort	Schwedeneck-class research vessel	Elsfleth shipyard	Elsfleth	West Germany	For German Navy
2 June	Young Endeavour	Brigantine	Brooke Yachts International.	Lowestoft	United Kingdom	For Royal Australian Navy.
13 June	Albany	Los Angeles-class submarine	Newport News Shipbuilding	Newport News, Virginia	United States	
17 June	Kapitan Danilkin	SA-15 type cargo ship	Wärtsilä Marine Vuosaari shipyard	Helsinki	Finland	
27 June	Gunston Hall	Whidbey Island-class dock landing ship	Avondale Shipyard	Avondale, Louisiana	United States	
10 July	Norfolk	Type 23 frigate	Yarrow Shipbuilders	Glasgow	United Kingdom	
12 July	Philippine Sea	Ticonderoga-class cruiser	Bath Iron Works	Bath, Maine	United States	
13 July	Wind Spirit	Motor sailing yacht	Ateliers et chantiers du Havre	Le Havre	France	For Windstar Cruises
18 July	Amorella	Cruiseferry	Brodogradevna Industrija	Split	Yugoslavia	for SF Line for Viking Line traffic
31 July	Helmsand	Schwedeneck-class research vessel	Kröger shipyard	Schacht-Audorf	West Germany	For German Navy
4 August	Wasp	Wasp-class amphibious assault ship	Ingalls Shipbuilding	Pascagoula, Mississippi	United States	
10 August	Bülk	Tugboat	Johann Oelkers KG	Hamburg	West Germany	For Schlepp- und Fährgesellschaft Kiel
15 August	Welsh Piper	Dredger	Appledore Ferguson Shipbuilders Ltd	Appledore	United Kingdom	For British Dredging Ltd.
9 September	Amagiri	Asagiri-class destroyer			Japan	
12 September	Pasadena	Los Angeles-class submarine	Electric Boat	Groton, Connecticut	United States	
17 September	Augsburg	Bremen-class frigate	Bremer Vulkan	Bremen-Vegesack	West Germany	For German Navy
21 September	Yūgiri	Asagiri-class destroyer			Japan	
23 September	Ironbridge	Bulk carrier	Harland & Wolff	Belfast	United Kingdom	For British Steel Corporation.
2 October	Princeton	Ticonderoga-class cruiser	Ingalls Shipbuilding	Pascagoula, Mississippi	United States	
2 October	Walter S. Diehl	Henry J. Kaiser-class replenishment oiler	Avondale Shipyard	Avondale, Louisiana	United States	
7 October	Campbeltown	Type 22 frigate	Cammell Laird	Birkenhead	United Kingdom	
10 October	San Marco	San Giorgio-class amphibious transport dock	Fincantieri		Italy	
10 October	Yamagiri	Asagiri-class destroyer			Japan	
15 October	Lübeck	Bremen-class frigate	Nordseewerke	Emden	West Germany	For German Navy
1 November	Crown Odyssey	Cruise ship	Meyer Werft	Papenburg	West Germany	For Royal Cruise Line
8 December	Isle of Mull	Ferry	Ferguson Shipbuilders	Port Glasgow	United Kingdom	For Caledonian MacBrayne
19 December	Reijin	Car transporter	Shin Kurushima Dockyard Co	Onishi	Japan	For Nissan Prince Kaiun K.K.
Unknown date	Changzheng 4	Type 091 nuclear-powered attack submarine	Huludao Shipyard	Huludao, Liaoning Province	China	
Unknown date	Eynhallow	Ro-Ro ferry	David Abels Boatbuilders Ltd.	Bristol	United Kingdom	For Orkney Ferries.
Unknown date	Granogwen	Fishery patrol vessel	David Abels Boatbuilders Ltd.	Bristol	United Kingdom	For South Wales Fisheries Committee.
Unknown date	Seillean	SWOPS ship	Harland & Wolff	Belfast	United Kingdom	For BP Petroleum Development.
Unknown date	Spray 38	Passenger ship	J. Bolson & Son Ltd.	Poole	United Kingdom	For Alan Guichard.
Unknown date	Watchman	Launch	David Abels Boatbuilders Ltd.	Bristol	United Kingdom	For private owner.
