= List of ship launches in 1986 =

The list of ship launches in 1986 includes a chronological list of all ships launched in 1986.

Date	Ship	Class / type	Builder	Location	Country	Notes
11 January	Rodney M. Davis	Oliver Hazard Perry-class frigate	Todd Pacific Shipyards	San Pedro, California	United States	For United States Navy.
17 January	Vulcain	Vulcain-class minesweeper	Chantiers et ateliers de la Perrière	Lorient	France	For French Navy.
24 January	Konstantin Chernenko	Dmitriy Shostakovich-class ferry	Stocznia Szczecinska im A Warskiego	Szczecin	Poland	For Far Eastern Shipping Company
29 January	Shimayuki	Hatsuyuki-class destroyer			Japan	For Japanese Navy.
1 February	Fort McHenry	Whidbey Island-class dock landing ship	Lockheed Shipbuilding	Seattle, Washington	United States	For United States Navy.
9 February	Takeshio	Yūshio-class submarine			Japan	For Japanese Navy.
14 February	Antietam	Ticonderoga-class cruiser	Ingalls Shipbuilding	Pascagoula, Mississippi	United States	For United States Navy.
14 February	Bellis	Tripartite-class minehunter	Mercantile-Belyard	Rupelmonde	Belgium	For Belgian Navy.
20 February	Sevmorput	LASH carrier	Zaliv Shipbuilding yard	Kerch, Ukraine	Soviet Union	Nuclear-powered cargo ship
21 February	Mercandian Universe	Type FV 2100 RoRo-ship	Frederikshavn Værft	Frederikshavn	Denmark	For Per Henriksen
22 February	Joshua Humphreys	Henry J. Kaiser-class replenishment oiler	Avondale Shipyard	Avondale, Louisiana	United States	
1 March	Atherstone	Hunt-class mine countermeasures vessel	Vosper Thornycroft	Woolston	United Kingdom	For Royal Navy.
15 March	Newport News	Los Angeles-class submarine	Newport News Shipbuilding	Newport News, Virginia	United States	For United States Navy.
26 March	Sheffield	Type 22 frigate	Swan Hunter	Wallsend	United Kingdom	For Royal Navy.
29 March	Kauffman	Oliver Hazard Perry-class frigate	Bath Iron Works	Bath, Maine	United States	For United States Navy.
8 April	Coventry	Type 22 frigate	Swan Hunter	Wallsend	United Kingdom	For Royal Navy.
24 April	Drakensberg	Fleet replenishment vessel	Sandock Austral	Durban, South Africa	Republic of South Africa	For South African Navy.
25 April	Kalinin	Kirov-class battlecruiser	Baltic Shipyard	Leningrad	Soviet Union	For Soviet Navy.
27 April	SKR-195	Koni-class frigate	Zelenodolsk Shipyard	Zelenodolsk	Soviet Union	For Soviet Navy.
9 May	Finn	Finnpusku pusher vessel	Hollming	Rauma	Finland	
30 May	Turgutreis	Yavuz-class frigate	HDW	Kiel	West Germany	For Turkish Navy.
30 May	Astor	Cruise ship	HDW	Kiel	West Germany	
30 May	Mercandian Sun II	Type FV 2100 RoRo-ship	Frederikshavn Værft	Frederikshavn	Denmark	For Per Henriksen
31 May	Sea-Land Anchorage	D7-class container ship	Bay Shipbuilding	Sturgeon Bay	United States	For Sea-Land Corporation
20 June	Leyte Gulf	Ticonderoga-class cruiser	Ingalls Shipbuilding	Pascagoula, Mississippi	United States	For United States Navy.
20 June	Assertive	Stalwart-class ocean surveillance ship	Tacoma Boatbuilding Company	Tacoma, Washington	United States	
21 June	Cumberland	Type 22 frigate	Yarrow Shipbuilders	Glasgow	United Kingdom	For Royal Navy.
28 June	Helena	Los Angeles-class submarine	Electric Boat	Groton, Connecticut	United States	For United States Navy.
9 July	Alliance	Research vessel	Cantiere navale del Muggiano	La Spezia	Italy	For NATO.
23 July	Victoria	Santa María-class frigate	Bazan	Ferrol	Spain	For Spanish Navy.
9 August	John Lenthall	Henry J. Kaiser-class replenishment oiler	Avondale Shipyard	Avondale, Louisiana	United States	
9 August	Celebration	Holiday-class cruise ship	Kockums	Malmö	Sweden	For Carnival Cruise Lines
16 August	Nils Holgersson	Cruiseferry	Schichau Seebeckwerft	Bremerhaven	West Germany	For Swecarrier for TT-Line traffic
22 August	Yuriy Arshenevskiy	SA-15 type cargo ship	Valmet Vuosaari shipyard	Helsinki	Finland	
29 August	Mercandian Sea II	Type FV 2100 RoRo-ship	Frederikshavn Værft	Frederikshavn	Denmark	For Per Henriksen
31 August	Kronprins Harald	Cruiseferry	Wärtsilä Perno shipyard	Turku	Finland	For Jahre Line
5 September	Arco Avon	Dredger	Appledore Ferguson Shipbuilders Ltd	Appledore	United Kingdom	For Hanson Aggregates Marine Ltd.
5 September	Berge Stahl	Ore carrier	Hyundai Heavy Industries	Ulsan	South Korea	
19 September	Asagiri	Asagiri-class destroyer			Japan	For Japanese Navy.
27 September	Sea-Land Tacoma	D7-class container ship	Bay Shipbuilding	Sturgeon Bay	United States	For Sea-Land Corporation
14 October	Exxon Valdez	Oil tanker	National Steel and Shipbuilding	San Diego, California	United States	For Exxon Corporation
14 October	Schwedeneck	Schwedeneck-class research vessel	Kröger shipyard	Schacht-Audorf	West Germany	For German Navy.
24 October	Nordstrand	Nordstand-class tug	Orenstein & Koppel	Lübeck	West Germany	For German Navy.
3 November	Trenchant	Trafalgar-class submarine	Vickers Shipbuilding	Barrow-in-Furness	United Kingdom	For Royal Navy.
14 November	San Jacinto	Ticonderoga-class cruiser	Ingalls Shipbuilding	Pascagoula, Mississippi	United States	For United States Navy.
28 November	Langeness	Nordstand-class tug	Orenstein & Koppel	Lübeck	West Germany	For German Navy.
6 December	San Juan	Los Angeles-class submarine	Electric Boat	Groton, Connecticut	United States	For United States Navy.
13 December	Tennessee	Ohio-class submarine	Electric Boat	Groton, Connecticut	United States	For United States Navy.
17 December	Vasiliy Burkhanov	SA-15 type cargo ship	Valmet Vuosaari shipyard	Helsinki	Finland	
20 December	Sea-Land Kodiak	D7-class container ship	Bay Shipbuilding	Sturgeon Bay	United States	For Sea-Land Corporation
Exact date unknown	Daifuku Maru No. 8	Cargo ship	Tokuoka Zosen K.K.	Naruto	Japan	For Daifuku Kaiun K.K.
Exact date unknown	Kontio	Icebreaker	Wärtsilä Helsinki Shipyard	Helsinki	Finland	
Exact date unknown	Albion	Workboat	David Abels Boatbuilders Ltd.	Bristol	United Kingdom	For Bristol City Council.
Exact date unknown	Argia	Gaff topsail schooner	Jennings Shipyard		United States	
Exact date unknown	Hubberston	Pilot boat	David Abels Boatbuilders Ltd.	Bristol	United Kingdom	For Milford Haven Port Authority.
Exact date unknown	Mary Marie	Fishing vessel	David Abels Boatbuilders Ltd.	Bristol	United Kingdom	For private owner.
Exact date unknown	Yarra	Workboat	Bailey & Boynton Ltd.	Hull	United Kingdom	For Bailey & Boynton Ltd.
