= Japanese submarine Setoshio =

At least two warships of Japan have been named Setoshio:

- JDS Setoshio (SS-575), a Yūshio-class submarine launched in 1981 and struck in 2001
- JS Setoshio (SS-599), an Oyashio-class submarine launched in 2007
