= Japanese submarine Mochishio =

At least two warships of Japan have been named Mochishio:

- JDS Mochishio (SS-574), a Yūshio-class submarine launched in 1980 and struck in 2000
- JS Mochishio (SS-600), an Oyashio-class submarine launched in 2006
