= JDS Hamashio =

Yūshio-class submarine

History

Japan
- Name: Hamashio; (はましお)
- Ordered: 1981
- Builder: Kawasaki, Kobe
- Laid down: 8 April 1982
- Launched: 1 February 1984
- Commissioned: 5 March 1985
- Decommissioned: 9 March 2006
- Reclassified: TSS-3604
- Home port: Kure
- Identification: Pennant number: SS-578
- Fate: Scrapped

General characteristics
- Class & type: Yūshio-class submarine
- Displacement: 2,250 tonnes (surfaced); 2,500 tonnes (submerged)
- Length: 76.0 m (249.3 ft)
- Beam: 9.9 m (32.5 ft)
- Draught: 7.4 m (24.3 ft)
- Propulsion: 1-shaft diesel-electric; 3,400 shp (2,500 kW) (surfaced); 7,200 shp (5,400 kW) (submerged)
- Speed: 12 knots (22 km/h; 14 mph) (surfaced); 20 knots (37 km/h; 23 mph) (submerged)
- Complement: 10 officers; 65–70 enlisted
- Sensors & processing systems: Sonar; Hughes/Oki ZQQ 5 hull mounted sonar; ZQR 1 towed array; Radar; JRC ZPS 5/6 I-band search radar.
- Armament: 6 × 21 in (533 mm) torpedo tubes with reloads for: 1.) Type 89 torpedo; 2.) Type 80 ASW Torpedo; 3.) UGM-84 Harpoon

JDS Hamashio (SS-578) was a Yūshio-class submarine. She was commissioned on 5 March 1985.

== Construction and career ==
Hamashio was laid down at Kawasaki Heavy Industries Kobe Shipyard on 8 April 1982 and launched on 1 February 1984. She was commissioned on 5 March 1985, into the 2nd Submarine Group in Yokosuka.

On 27 March 1985, she was transferred as the 2nd submarine with JDS Nadashio on the same day.

She participated in Hawaii dispatch training from 10 September to 11 December 1987.

Around 8:30 am on 7 April 1994, a fire broke out from the switchboard in the engine room during charging work at the Yokosuka base, one person was burned, and several people inhaled gas. The fire was extinguished in about 10 minutes.

On 9 March 2000, she was transferred to the 6th submarine (Yokosuka) of the 2nd Submarine Group.

On 4 March 2003, she was reclassified as a training submarine, her hull number changed to TSS-3604, she was transferred to the 1st training submarine under the direct control of the submarine fleet, and her homeport became Kure.

She was decommissioned on 9 March 2006.

She was dismantled at a scrap factory in Etajima on 22 January 2008.
