= JDS Yūshio =

Yūshio-class submarine

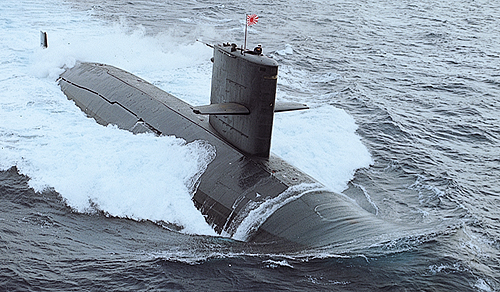
- JDS Yūshio

History

Japan
- Name: Yūshio; (ゆうしお)
- Ordered: 1975
- Builder: Mitsubishi, Kobe
- Laid down: 3 December 1976
- Launched: 29 March 1979
- Commissioned: 26 February 1980
- Decommissioned: 11 March 1999
- Reclassified: ATSS-8006
- Home port: Kure
- Identification: Pennant number: SS-573
- Fate: Scrapped

General characteristics
- Class & type: Yūshio-class submarine
- Displacement: 2,200 tonnes (surfaced); 2,450 tonnes (submerged)
- Length: 76.0 m (249.3 ft)
- Beam: 9.9 m (32.5 ft)
- Draught: 7.4 m (24.3 ft)
- Propulsion: 1-shaft diesel-electric; 3,400 shp (2,500 kW) (surfaced); 7,200 shp (5,400 kW) (submerged)
- Speed: 12 knots (22 km/h; 14 mph) (surfaced); 20 knots (37 km/h; 23 mph) (submerged)
- Complement: 10 officers; 65–70 enlisted
- Sensors & processing systems: Sonar; Hughes/Oki ZQQ 5 hull mounted sonar; ZQR 1 towed array; Radar; JRC ZPS 5/6 I-band search radar.
- Armament: 6 × 21 in (533 mm) torpedo tubes with reloads for: 1.) Type 89 torpedo; 2.) Type 80 ASW Torpedo; 3.) UGM-84 Harpoon

JDS Yūshio (SS-573) was the lead boat of the Yūshio-class submarine. She was commissioned on 7 March 1978.

== Construction and career ==
Yūshio was laid down at Mitsubishi Heavy Industries Kobe Shipyard on 14 April 1975 and launched on 19 May 1977. She was commissioned on 7 March 1978, into the 1st Submarine Group.

On 5 March 1981, she was transferred to the 1st Submarine Group, which was newly commissioned under the 1st Submarine Group, along with JDS Mochishio, who was commissioned on the same day.

Around 2:00 am on 12 May 1984, while sailing with a periscope off the south coast of Cape Muroto, she came into contact with the bottom of the Indian-flagged ore carrier Satya Kairash (42,198 tons) sailing to Higashiharima Port in Hyogo Prefecture and had a built-in sonar. The resulting collision caused damage to the ore carrier's underside tank.

On 1 August 1996, she was reclassified as an auxiliary submarine, her hull number was changed to ATSS-8006, and she became a ship under the direct control of the 1st Submarine Group.

She was decommissioned on 11 March 1999.
