= JDS Okishio =

Yūshio-class submarine

History

Japan
- Name: Okishio; (おきしお)
- Ordered: 1979
- Builder: Kawasaki, Kobe
- Laid down: 17 April 1980
- Launched: 5 March 1982
- Commissioned: 1 March 1983
- Decommissioned: 4 March 2003
- Reclassified: TSS-3603
- Home port: Kure
- Identification: Pennant number: SS-576
- Fate: Scrapped

General characteristics
- Class & type: Yūshio-class submarine
- Displacement: 2,300 tonnes (surfaced); 2,900 tonnes (submerged)
- Length: 76.0 m (249.3 ft)
- Beam: 9.9 m (32.5 ft)
- Draught: 7.4 m (24.3 ft)
- Propulsion: 1-shaft diesel-electric; 3,400 shp (2,500 kW) (surfaced); 7,200 shp (5,400 kW) (submerged)
- Speed: 12 knots (22 km/h; 14 mph) (surfaced); 20 knots (37 km/h; 23 mph) (submerged)
- Complement: 10 officers; 65–70 enlisted
- Sensors & processing systems: Sonar; Hughes/Oki ZQQ 5 hull mounted sonar; ZQR 1 towed array; Radar; JRC ZPS 5/6 I-band search radar.
- Armament: 6 × 21 in (533 mm) torpedo tubes with reloads for: 1.) Type 89 torpedo; 2.) Type 80 ASW Torpedo; 3.) UGM-84 Harpoon

JDS Okishio (SS-576) was a Yūshio-class submarine. She was commissioned on 1 March 1983.

== Construction and career ==
Okishio was laid down at Kawasaki Heavy Industries Kobe Shipyard on 17 April 1980 and launched on 5 March 1982. She was commissioned on 1 March 1983, into the 2nd Submarine Group in Yokosuka.

She later participated in Hawaii dispatch training from 9 September to 3 December 1985.

From 1 July to 30 November 1987, she undergone additional equipment work on the towed sonar (S-TASS). This will increase her standard displacement by about 100 tonnes.

She participated in Hawaii dispatch training from August 4 to November 5, 1988.

On 12 March 1997, she was transferred as the 1st submarine of the 1st Submarine Group, and her homeport was transferred to Kure.

On 29 March 2001, she was reclassified as a training submarine, her hull number changed to TSS-3603, and she was transferred to the Fleet Submarine 1st Training Submarine.

She was decommissioned on 4 March 2003.
