= JDS Sachishio =

Yūshio-class submarine

History

Japan
- Name: Sachishio; (さちしお)
- Ordered: 1985
- Builder: Kawasaki, Kobe
- Laid down: 11 April 1986
- Launched: 17 February 1988
- Commissioned: 24 March 1989
- Decommissioned: 14 April 2006
- Home port: Yokosuka
- Identification: Pennant number: SS-582
- Fate: Scrapped

General characteristics
- Class & type: Yūshio-class submarine
- Displacement: 2,250 tonnes (surfaced); 2,500 tonnes (submerged)
- Length: 76.0 m (249.3 ft)
- Beam: 9.9 m (32.5 ft)
- Draught: 7.4 m (24.3 ft)
- Propulsion: 1-shaft diesel-electric; 3,400 shp (2,500 kW) (surfaced); 7,200 shp (5,400 kW) (submerged)
- Speed: 12 knots (22 km/h; 14 mph) (surfaced); 20 knots (37 km/h; 23 mph) (submerged)
- Complement: 10 officers; 65–70 enlisted
- Sensors & processing systems: Sonar; Hughes/Oki ZQQ 5 hull mounted sonar; ZQR 1 towed array; Radar; JRC ZPS 5/6 I-band search radar.
- Armament: 6 × 21 in (533 mm) torpedo tubes with reloads for: 1.) Type 89 torpedo; 2.) Type 80 ASW Torpedo; 3.) UGM-84 Harpoon

JDS Sachishio (SS-582) was a Yūshio-class submarine. She was commissioned on 24 March 1989.

== Construction and career ==
Sachishio was laid down at Kawasaki Heavy Industries Kobe Shipyard on 11 April 1986 and launched on 17 February 1988. She was commissioned on 24 March 1989, into the 2nd Submarine Group in Yokosuka.

Participated in Hawaii dispatch training from August 8 to November 28, 1990.

She participated in Hawaii dispatch training from January 18 to April 20, 1993.

On 4 March 2003, she was transferred as the 6th submarine (Yokosuka) of the 2nd Submarine Group.

In December 2007, she was dismantled at Etajima.
