= MV Peter Faber =

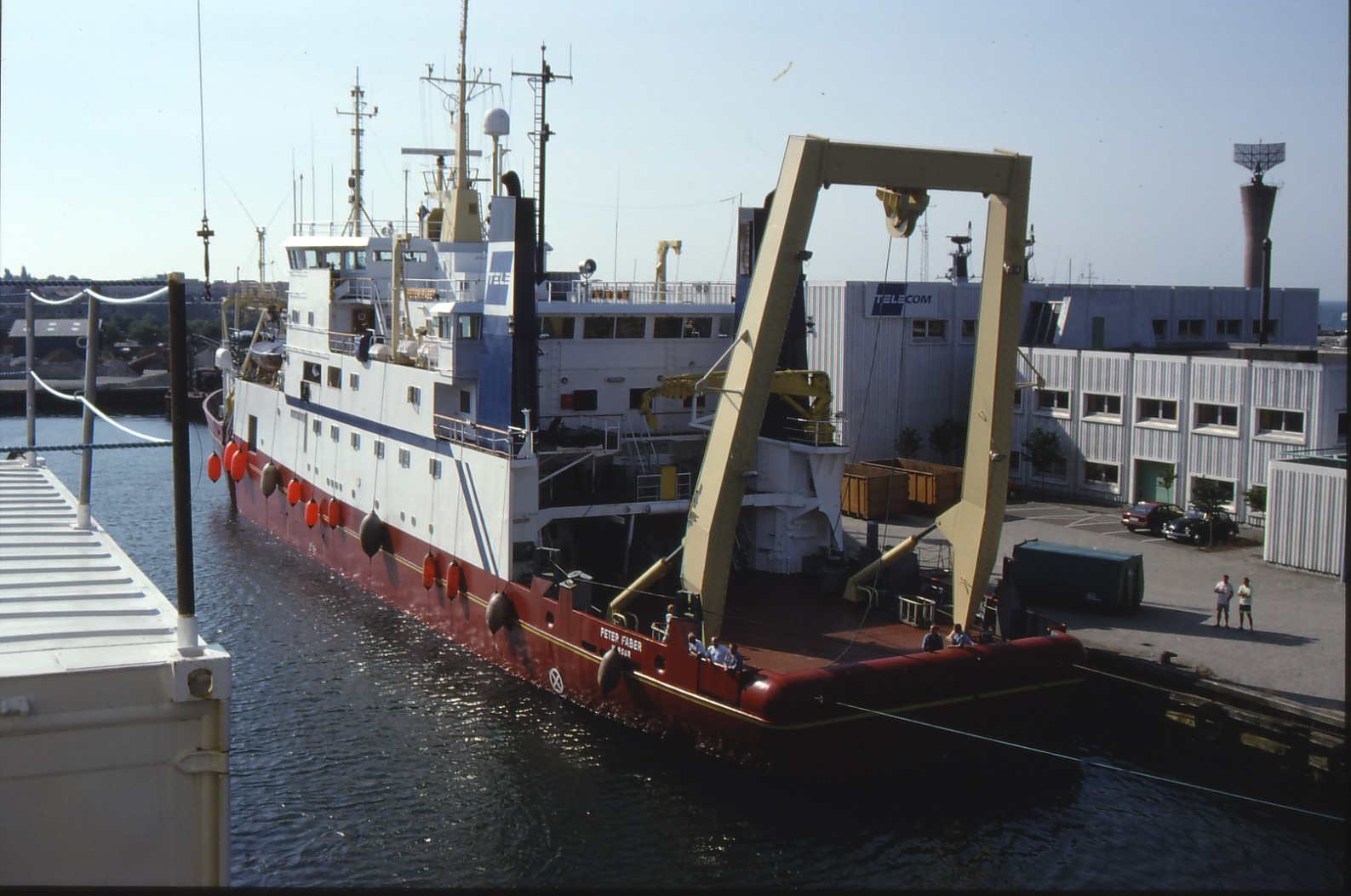
- MV Peter Faber

History
- Name: Peter Faber
- Operator: Alcatel Marine, Copenhagen
- Launched: 16 December 1981
- Status: In service

General characteristics
- Displacement: 2,584 tonnes
- Length: 78.4 m (257 ft)
- Draft: 5 m (16 ft)

The MV Peter Faber is a French cable-laying vessel. In the Fall of 2008 the Peter Faber will be laying a telecommunication cable connecting Newfoundland, Greenland and Iceland. The Peter Faber made a relatively uncommon transit through the Northwest Passage to travel from its previous assignment in the Pacific Ocean.

There have been three vessels named the Peter Faber that have laid cable in the Arctic. The first was launched in 1913, the second in 1962, and the most recent in 1981.
