= Soviet frigate Zadornyy =

Krivak-class frigate

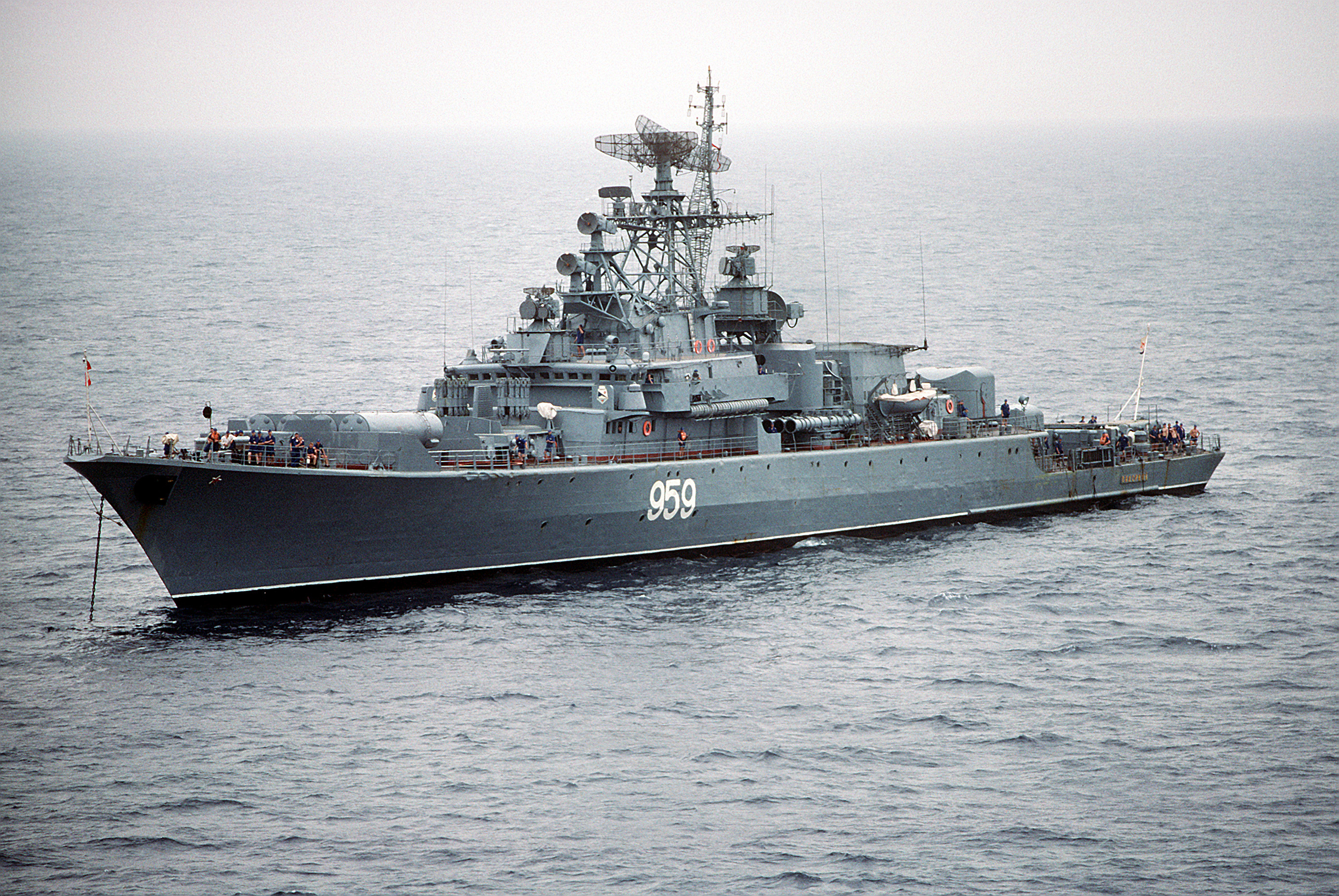
- A port bow view of Zadornyy at anchor in 1988

History

Soviet Union
- Name: Zadornyy
- Namesake: Russian for Provocative
- Builder: A.A. Zhdanov, Leningrad
- Yard number: 716
- Laid down: 10 November 1977
- Launched: 25 March 1979
- Commissioned: 31 August 1979
- Decommissioned: 3 December 2005
- Fate: Sold to be broken up

General characteristics
- Class & type: Project 1135 Burevestnik frigate
- Displacement: 2,810 t (2,770 long tons; 3,100 short tons) (standard); 3,200 t (3,100 long tons; 3,500 short tons) (full load)
- Length: 123 m (403 ft 7 in)
- Beam: 142 m (465 ft 11 in)
- Draft: 4.5 m (14 ft 9 in)
- Installed power: 48,000 shp (36,000 kW)
- Propulsion: 4 gas turbines; COGAG; 2 shafts
- Speed: 32 knots (59 km/h; 37 mph)
- Range: 3,950 nmi (7,315 km; 4,546 mi) at 14 knots (26 km/h; 16 mph)
- Complement: 23 officers, 174 men
- Sensors & processing systems: MR-310A Angara-A air/surface search radar; Volga and Don navigational radars; MG-332 Titan-2 and MG-325 Vega sonars
- Electronic warfare & decoys: PK-16 decoy-dispenser system
- Armament: 4 × URPK-3 Metel (SS-N-14 'Silex') anti-submarine missiles (1×4); 4 × ZIF-122 4K33 launchers (2×2) with 40 4K33 OSA-M (SA-N-4'Gecko') surface-to-air missiles; 4 × 76 mm (3 in) AK-726 guns (2×2); 2 × 45 mm (2 in) 21-KM guns (2×1); 2 × RBU-6000 Smerch-2 anti-submarine rockets; 8 × 533 mm (21 in) torpedo tubes (2×4); 18 mines

Zadornyy (Russian: Задорный, lit. 'Provocative') was a Project 1135 Burevestnik-class guard ship or Krivak-class frigate that served with the Soviet and Russian Navies. Displacing 3,200 tonnes (3,100 long tons; 3,500 short tons) full load, the vessel was built around the Metel anti-submarine missile system. Zadornyy was launched on 25 March 1979 in Leningrad, the last of the class to be built by the A.A. Zhdanov shipyard, and served with the Northern Fleet. After taking part in exercises Avangard-81, Sever-81 and Okean-83, and cruising as far as Havana, Cuba, the vessel was upgraded between 11 June 1990 and 23 May 1995 with missiles that added anti-ship capability. While serving with the Russian Navy, the ship took part in joint exercises with frigates of the Royal Navy, including a commemoration of the first Arctic convoy of the Second World War with HMS Campbeltown. After more than twenty-five years service, the ship was decommissioned on 3 December 2005.

== Design and development ==
Designed by N.P. Sobolov, Zadornyy was one of twenty-one Project 1135 Burevestnik (Russian: Буревестник, "Petrel") class ships launched between 1970 and 1981. Project 1135 was envisaged by the Soviet Navy as a less expensive complement to the Project 1134A Berkut A (NATO reporting name 'Kresta II') and Project 1134B Berkut B (NATO reporting name 'Kara') classes of anti-submarine warfare ships. The design was originally given to TsKB-340, which had designed the earlier Project 159 (NATO reporting name 'Petya') and Project 35 (NATO reporting name 'Mirka') classes. However, the expansion in the United States Navy ballistic missile submarine fleet and the introduction of longer-ranged and more accurate submarine-launched ballistic missiles led to a revisit of the project. The work was transferred to TsKB-53 in Leningrad who produced a substantially larger and more capable design. However, Zadornyy retained the same Guard Ship (Сторожевой Корабль, SKR) designation as the smaller vessels, reflecting the Soviet strategy of creating protected areas for friendly ballistic missile submarines close to the coast. NATO forces called the new vessels Krivak-class frigates.

Displacing 2,810 tonnes (2,770 long tons; 3,100 short tons) standard and 3,200 t (3,100 long tons; 3,500 short tons) full load, Zadornyy was 123 m (404 ft) long overall, with a beam of 14.2 m (46 ft 7 in) and a draught of 4.5 m (14 ft 9 in). Power was provided by two M7 sets, each consisting of a combination of a 18,000-shaft-horsepower (13,000 kW) DK59 and a 6,000 shp (4,500 kW) M62 gas turbine combined in a COGAG installation and driving one fixed-pitch propeller. Design speed was 32 knots (59 km/h; 37 mph) and range was 3,950 nautical miles (7,315 km; 4,546 mi) at 14 knots (26 km/h; 16 mph). The ship's complement was 197, including 23 officers.

=== Armament and sensors ===
Zadornyy initially had a primary mission of anti-submarine warfare and for this end was equipped with four URPK-3 Metel missiles (NATO reporting name SS-N-14 Silex), backed up by two quadruple torpedo tube mounts for 533 mm (21 in) torpedoes and a pair of 213 mm (8 in) RBU-6000 Smerch-2 anti-submarine rocket launchers. The main armament was upgraded to URPK-5 Rastrub (SS-N-14B) missiles to add anti-shipping capability between 11 June 1990 and 23 May 1995. Defence against aircraft was provided by forty 4K33 OSA-M (SA-N-4 'Gecko') surface-to-air missiles which were launched from two sets of ZIF-122 launchers, each capable of launching two missiles. Two twin 76 mm (3 in) AK-726 guns were mounted aft and two single mounts for 45 mm (2 in) 21-km guns were carried on the superstructure. Provision was made for carrying 18 mines.

Zadornyy had a well-equipped sensor suite, including a single MR-310A Angara-A air/surface search radar, Volga and Don-2 navigation radars, the MP-401S Start-S ESM radar system and the Spectrum-F laser warning system. An extensive sonar complex was fitted, including MG-332 Titan-2, which was mounted in a bow radome, and MG-325 Vega. The latter was a towed-array sonar specifically developed for the class and had a range of up to 15 km (9.3 mi; 8.1 nmi). The ship was also equipped with the PK-16 decoy-dispenser system.

== Construction and career ==
Named for the Russian word for Provocative, Zadornyy served with the Soviet Navy, and the Russian Navy after the dissolution of the Soviet Union, as an anti-submarine frigate. The vessel was laid down by the A.A. Zhdanov shipyard in Leningrad on 10 November 1977, the last of the class to be constructed by the shipbuilder, and was given the yard number 716. Launched on 25 March 1979 and commissioned on 31 August, the vessel was accepted into the Northern Fleet on 13 September the same year as part of the 10th Brigade.

Serving in the anti-submarine warfare role, Zadornyy started the new decade involved in the Avangard-81, Sever-81 and Okean-83 fleet exercises. These increasingly demonstrated the Soviet ability to operate as a blue-water navy. As part of operations in the Atlantic Ocean, Caribbean Sea and Mediterranean Sea, the ship visited Havana, Cuba, between 28 December 1984 and 2 January 1985, and Algiers, Algeria, between 2 and 6 May 1985. The Cuban visit was repeated between 3 and 7 November 1988 when Zadornyy returned to Havana along with the Large Anti-Submarine Ship (Большой Противолодочный Корабль, BPK) Vice-Admiral Kulakov and Project 641B submarine B-215.

With the dissolution of the Soviet Union on 26 December 1991, the ship was transferred to the Russian Navy and, in 1996, took part in the Navy's Tricentennial at Arkhangelsk. Later Zadornyy took part in a number of joint operations with Royal Navy frigates, operating with HMS Iron Duke in the Barents Sea in honour of the Arctic convoys of World War II during June 1997, taking part in an August 2001 exercise named Dervish after the first Arctic convoy with HMS Campbeltown, and hosting HMS Sutherland on a visit to Murmansk in May 2005. Soon afterwards, on 3 December 2005, the ship was decommissioned. The flag was finally lowered on 6 February 2006 and the ship sold to be broken up on 16 August 2006.
