= JDS Setoshio (SS-575) =

Yūshio-class submarine

History

Japan
- Name: Setoshio; (せとしお)
- Ordered: 1978
- Builder: Mitsubishi, Kobe
- Laid down: 17 April 1979
- Launched: 10 February 1981
- Commissioned: 17 March 1982
- Decommissioned: 30 March 2001
- Reclassified: ATSS-8008; TSS-3602
- Home port: Kure
- Identification: Pennant number: SS-575
- Fate: Scrapped

General characteristics
- Class & type: Yūshio-class submarine
- Displacement: 2,200 tonnes (surfaced); 2,450 tonnes (submerged)
- Length: 76.0 m (249.3 ft)
- Beam: 9.9 m (32.5 ft)
- Draught: 7.4 m (24.3 ft)
- Propulsion: 1-shaft diesel-electric; 3,400 shp (2,500 kW) (surfaced); 7,200 shp (5,400 kW) (submerged)
- Speed: 12 knots (22 km/h; 14 mph) (surfaced); 20 knots (37 km/h; 23 mph) (submerged)
- Complement: 10 officers; 65–70 enlisted
- Sensors & processing systems: Sonar; Hughes/Oki ZQQ 5 hull mounted sonar; ZQR 1 towed array; Radar; JRC ZPS 5/6 I-band search radar.
- Armament: 6 × 21 in (533 mm) torpedo tubes with reloads for: 1.) Type 89 torpedo; 2.) Type 80 ASW Torpedo; 3.) UGM-84 Harpoon

JDS Setoshio (SS-575) was a Yūshio-class submarine. She was commissioned on 17 March 1982.

== Construction and career ==
Setoshio was laid down at Mitsubishi Heavy Industries Kobe Shipyard on 17 April 1979 and launched on 10 February 1981. She was commissioned on 17 March 1982, into the 2nd Submarine Group.

She joined as the 3rd submarine of the 2nd Submarine Group in Yokosuka on 1 March 1983.

From July 22 to July 23, 1988, she participated in the Izu Oshima Offshore Exhibition Training with JDS Kurama.

On 6 June 1989, while she was acting as an anti-submarine training target ship, she came in contact with the seabed of the Tsugaru Straits, damaging her bow.

She was transferred to the 1st submarine of the 1st Submarine Group on 1 March 1994, and her fixed port was transferred to Kure.

On 10 March 1999, she was reclassified as an auxiliary submarine, her hull number changed to ATSS-8008, and she was transferred to the 1st Submarine Group as a direct control ship.

On 9 March 2000, she was reclassified as a training submarine, her hull number was TSS-3602, and she was transferred to the first training submarine, which was newly formed under the submarine fleet, with JDS Asashio.

She was decommissioned on 30 March 2001.
