= JDS Nadashio =

History

Japan
- Name: Nadashio; (なだしお)
- Ordered: 1980
- Builder: Mitsubishi, Kobe
- Laid down: 16 April 1981
- Launched: 27 January 1983
- Commissioned: 6 March 1984
- Decommissioned: 1 June 2001
- Identification: Pennant number: SS-577
- Fate: Scrapped

General characteristics
- Class & type: Yūshio-class submarine
- Displacement: 2,250 tonnes (surfaced)
- Length: 76.0 m (249.3 ft)
- Beam: 9.9 m (32.5 ft)
- Draught: 7.4 m (24.3 ft)
- Propulsion: 1-shaft diesel-electric; 3,400 shp (2,500 kW) (surfaced); 7,200 shp (5,400 kW) (submerged)
- Speed: 12 knots (22 km/h; 14 mph) (surfaced); 20 knots (37 km/h; 23 mph) (submerged)
- Complement: 10 officers; 65–70 enlisted
- Sensors & processing systems: Sonar; Hughes/Oki ZQQ 5 hull mounted sonar; ZQR 1 towed array; Radar; JRC ZPS 5/6 I-band search radar.
- Armament: 6 × 21 in (533 mm) torpedo tubes with reloads for: 1.) Type 89 torpedo; 2.) Type 80 ASW Torpedo; 3.) UGM-84 Harpoon

JDS Nadashio (SS-577) was a Japanese diesel-electric Yūshio-class submarine weighing 2,250 tons. It was launched on 27 January 1983 and decommissioned by the Maritime Self-Defense Force on 1 June 2001.

== Design and construction ==
The Yūshio-class was an enlarged derivative of the preceding Uzushio class, with improved electronics and capable of diving to greater depths. Ten Yūshios were built, to a regular programme of one being ordered each Fiscal Year.

Nadashio was 76.0 m (249 ft 4 in) long, with a beam of 9.9 m (32 ft 6 in) and maximum draught of 7.5 m (24 ft 7 in). Displacement was 2,250 t (2,210 long tons) surfaced. Like the Uzushios, the class was of double-hull construction, with a streamlined teardrop hull. A 7,200 hp (5,400 kW) electric motor drove a single propeller shaft, while two Kawasaki-MAN diesel engines could charge the ship's batteries and power the ship on the surface. Speed was 20 kn (23 mph; 37 km/h) submerged and 13 knots (15 mph; 24 km/h) on the surface. Six 21-inch (533 mm) torpedo tubes were fitted amidships, while Nadashio was the first of her class to be able to launch Sub-Harpoon anti-ship missiles. She had a crew of 75–80.

Nadashio was ordered under the Fiscal Year 1980 shipbuilding programme, and was laid down at Mitsubishi Heavy Industries' Kobe shipyard on 16 April 1981. She was launched on 27 January 1983 and commissioned on 6 March 1984.

== Service ==
In 1987, Nadashio was the first of her class to be fitted with a towed array sonar.

On 23 July 1988 the submarine collided with and sank the sports fishing boat Fuji Maru No 1 causing the death of 30 people and injuring a further 17. Both the captain of Nadashio and the skipper of Fuji Maru No 1 were given suspended prison sentences because of the collision, while the Director General of the Japanese Defense Agency resigned as a result of the accident.
