= JDS Takeshio =

Yūshio-class submarine

History

Japan
- Name: Takeshio; (たけしお)
- Ordered: 1983
- Builder: Kawasaki, Kobe
- Laid down: 3 April 1984
- Launched: 9 February 1986
- Commissioned: 3 March 1987
- Decommissioned: 9 March 2005
- Home port: Yokosuka
- Identification: Pennant number: SS-580
- Fate: Scrapped

General characteristics
- Class & type: Yūshio-class submarine
- Displacement: 2,250 tonnes (surfaced); 2,500 tonnes (submerged)
- Length: 76.0 m (249.3 ft)
- Beam: 9.9 m (32.5 ft)
- Draught: 7.4 m (24.3 ft)
- Propulsion: 1-shaft diesel-electric; 3,400 shp (2,500 kW) (surfaced); 7,200 shp (5,400 kW) (submerged)
- Speed: 12 knots (22 km/h; 14 mph) (surfaced); 20 knots (37 km/h; 23 mph) (submerged)
- Complement: 10 officers; 65–70 enlisted
- Sensors & processing systems: Sonar; Hughes/Oki ZQQ 5 hull mounted sonar; ZQR 1 towed array; Radar; JRC ZPS 5/6 I-band search radar.
- Armament: 6 × 21 in (533 mm) torpedo tubes with reloads for: 1.) Type 89 torpedo; 2.) Type 80 ASW Torpedo; 3.) UGM-84 Harpoon

JDS Takeshio (SS-580) was a Yūshio-class submarine. She was commissioned on 5 March 1985.

== Construction and career ==
Takeshio was laid down at Kawasaki Heavy Industries Kobe Shipyard on 3 April 1984 and launched on 9 February 1986. She was commissioned on 3 March 1987, into the 2nd Submarine Group in Yokosuka.

Since June 1988, she has participated in the Exercise RIMPAC '88 in 1988 and became the first Japanese submarine to launch the first Harpoon anti-ship missile underwater.

She left Yokosuka on 9 May 1994 and participated in Exercise RIMPAC '94 with JDS Kurama in 1994.

She was decommissioned on 9 March 2006.

In January 2006, she left Yokosuka for Dokai Bay, where the dismantling site is located.
