= JDS Yukishio =

Yūshio-class submarine

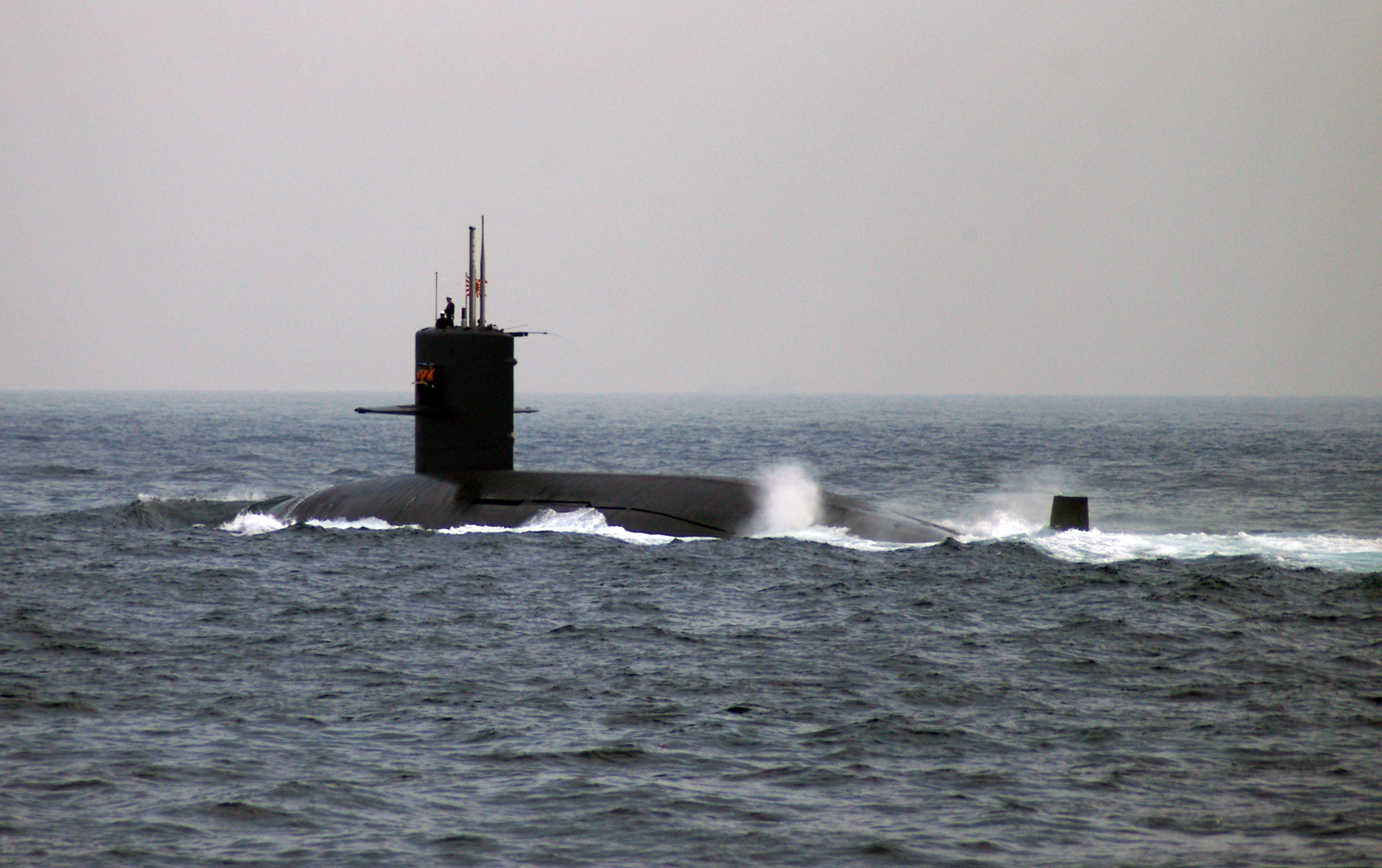
- JDS Yukishio on 29 October 2006

History

Japan
- Name: Yukishio; (ゆきしお)
- Ordered: 1984
- Builder: Mitsubishi, Kobe
- Laid down: 11 April 1985
- Launched: 23 January 1987
- Commissioned: 11 March 1988
- Decommissioned: 7 March 2008
- Reclassified: TSS-3605
- Home port: Port of Yokosuka
- Identification: Pennant number: SS-581
- Fate: Scrapped

General characteristics
- Class & type: Yūshio-class submarine
- Displacement: 2,250 tonnes (surfaced); 2,500 tonnes (submerged)
- Length: 76.0 m (249.3 ft)
- Beam: 9.9 m (32.5 ft)
- Draught: 7.4 m (24.3 ft)
- Propulsion: 1-shaft diesel-electric; 3,400 shp (2,500 kW) (surfaced); 7,200 shp (5,400 kW) (submerged)
- Speed: 12 knots (22 km/h; 14 mph) (surfaced); 20 knots (37 km/h; 23 mph) (submerged)
- Complement: 10 officers; 65–70 enlisted
- Sensors & processing systems: Sonar; Hughes/Oki ZQQ 5 hull mounted sonar; ZQR 1 towed array; Radar; JRC ZPS 5/6 I-band search radar.
- Armament: 6 × 21 in (533 mm) torpedo tubes with reloads for: 1.) Type 89 torpedo; 2.) Type 80 ASW Torpedo; 3.) UGM-84 Harpoon

JDS Yukishio (SS-581) was a Yūshio-class submarine in the Japan Maritime Self-Defense Force. She was commissioned on 11 March 1988.

== Construction and career ==
Yukishio was laid down at Mitsubishi Heavy Industries Kobe Shipyard on 11 April 1985 and launched on 23 January 1987. The ship's name derives from “Yukishio,” which means “tides flowing amid falling snow.” She was commissioned on 11 March 1988, into the 4nd Submarine Squadron of the 2nd Submarine Flotilla in Yokosuka.

She primarily participated in various exercises and training aimed at improving anti-submarine warfare capabilities, she also took part in Hawaii dispatch training from 21 September – 19 December 1989.

On 9 March 2006, she was reclassified as a training submarine, her hull number changed to TSS-3605, she was transferred to the 1st Submarine Training Squadron under the direct control of the Fleet Submarine Force, and her fixed port was transferred to Kure. As a training submarine, it was operated specifically for educational purposes, providing new crew members with practical training in shiphandling techniques, diving and surfacing procedures, and emergency response.

Its service as a training submarine lasted approximately two years. It was decommissioned on March 7, 2008, bringing its nearly 20-year service history to a close.

== Gallery ==
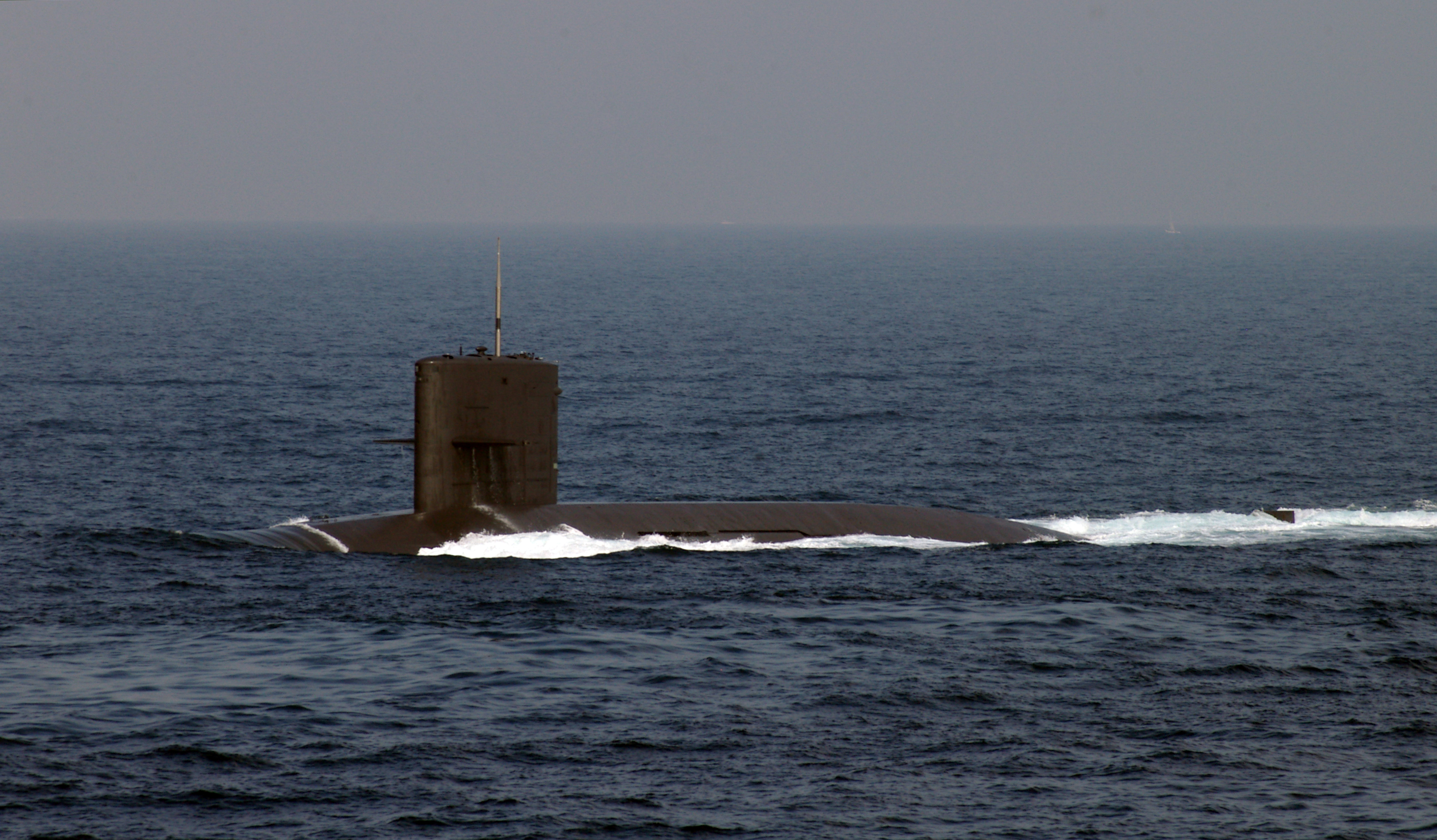
JDS Yukishio on 29 October 2006
