= JDS Mochishio (SS-574) =

Yūshio-class submarine

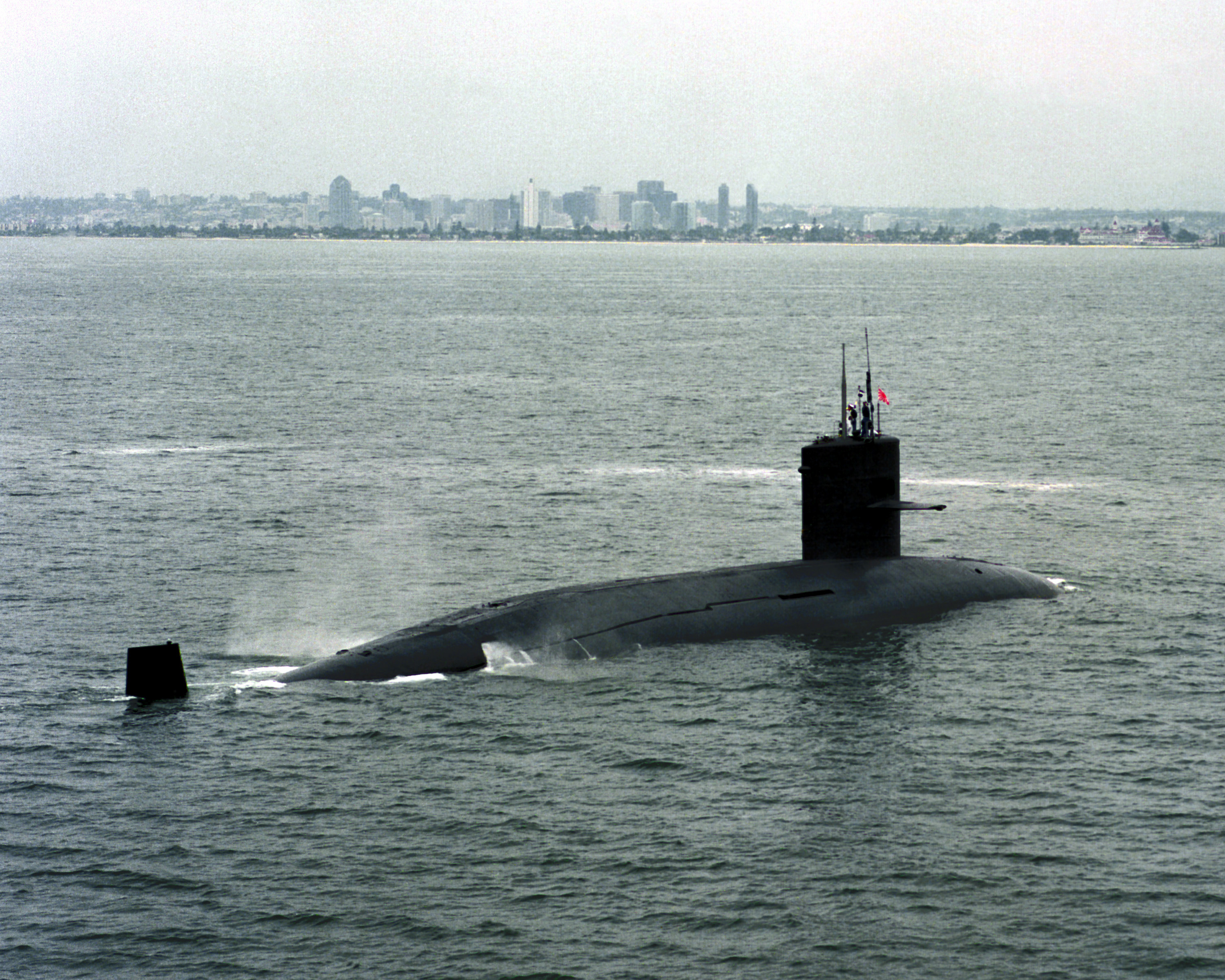
- JDS Mochishio

History

Japan
- Name: Mochishio; (もちしお)
- Ordered: 1977
- Builder: Kawasaki, Kobe
- Laid down: 9 May 1978
- Launched: 12 March 1980
- Commissioned: 5 March 1981
- Decommissioned: 10 March 2000
- Reclassified: ATSS-8007
- Home port: Kure
- Identification: Pennant number: SS-574
- Fate: Scrapped

General characteristics
- Class & type: Yūshio-class submarine
- Displacement: 2,200 tonnes (surfaced); 2,450 tonnes (submerged)
- Length: 76.0 m (249.3 ft)
- Beam: 9.9 m (32.5 ft)
- Draught: 7.4 m (24.3 ft)
- Propulsion: 1-shaft diesel-electric; 3,400 shp (2,500 kW) (surfaced); 7,200 shp (5,400 kW) (submerged)
- Speed: 12 knots (22 km/h; 14 mph) (surfaced); 20 knots (37 km/h; 23 mph) (submerged)
- Complement: 10 officers; 65–70 enlisted
- Sensors & processing systems: Sonar; Hughes/Oki ZQQ 5 hull mounted sonar; ZQR 1 towed array; Radar; JRC ZPS 5/6 I-band search radar.
- Armament: 6 × 21 in (533 mm) torpedo tubes with reloads for: 1.) Type 89 torpedo; 2.) Type 80 ASW Torpedo; 3.) UGM-84 Harpoon

JDS Mochishio (SS-574) was a Yūshio-class submarine. She was commissioned on 5 March 1981.

== Construction and career ==
Mochishio was laid down at Kawasaki Heavy Industries Kobe Shipyard on 9 May 1978 and launched on 12 March 1980. She was commissioned on 5 March 1981, into the 1st Submarine Group.

On 9 April 1986, a special remodeling work was completed to enable Harpoon's USM to be launched from the torpedo tube, which will increase the standard displacement by about 50 tons. She participated in Hawaii dispatch training from August 19 to November 21 of the same year.

Since April 1990, she has been dispatched to Hawaii and San Diego along with JDS Haruna, and from April 26 to June 2, she would participate in the RIMPAC '90 exercise.

She participated in RIMPAC '92 in 1992.

In July 1997, Mitsubishi Heavy Industries Kobe Shipyard & Machinery Works began remodeling work into a special submarine, removing torpedoes and setting up an auditorium for trainees. On August 1, the same year, she was changed to an auxiliary submarine, her hull number was changed to ATSS-8007, and she became a ship under the direct control of the 1st submarine group.

She was decommissioned on 10 March 2000.

== Gallery ==
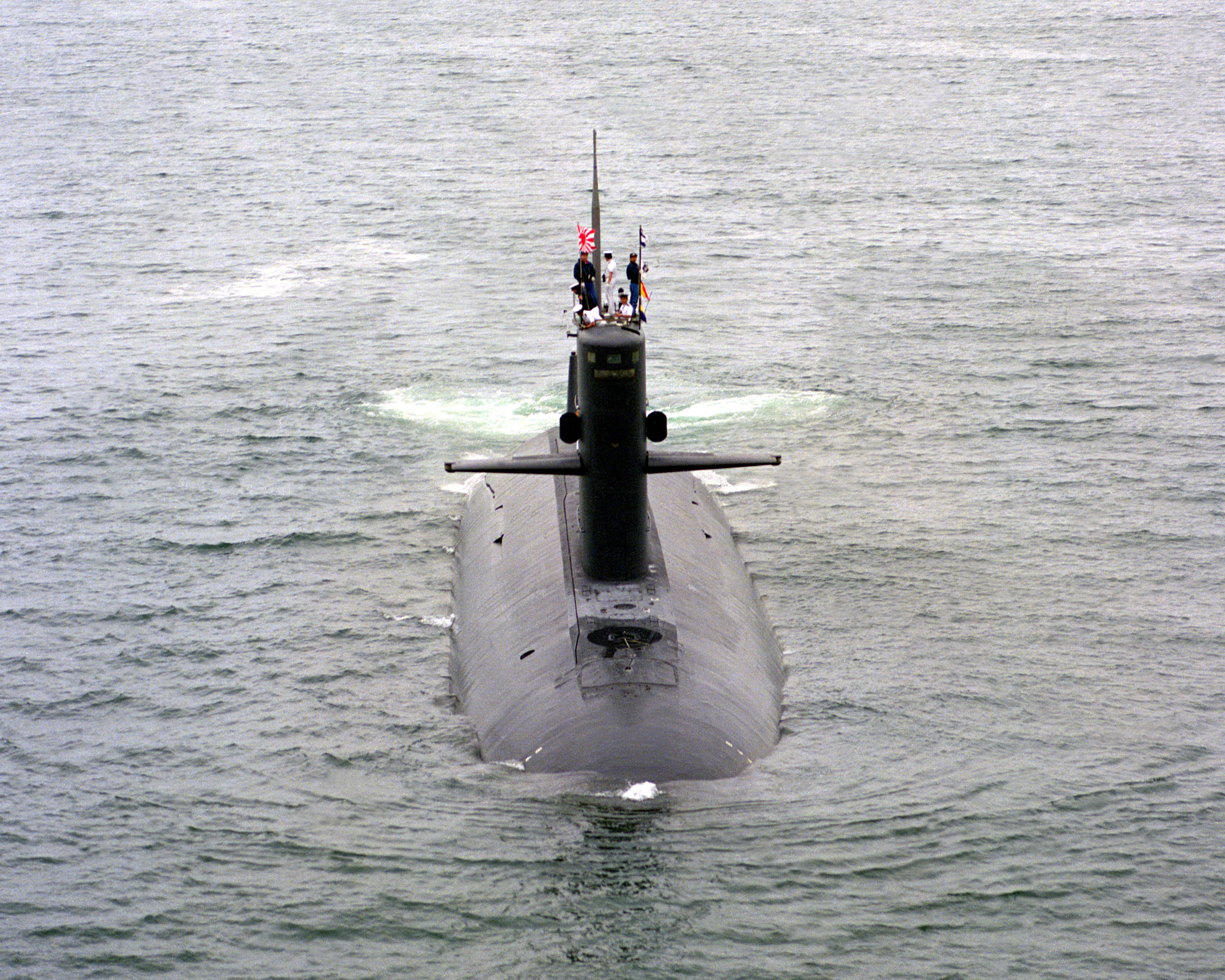
JS Mochishio at San Diego on 10 June 1992

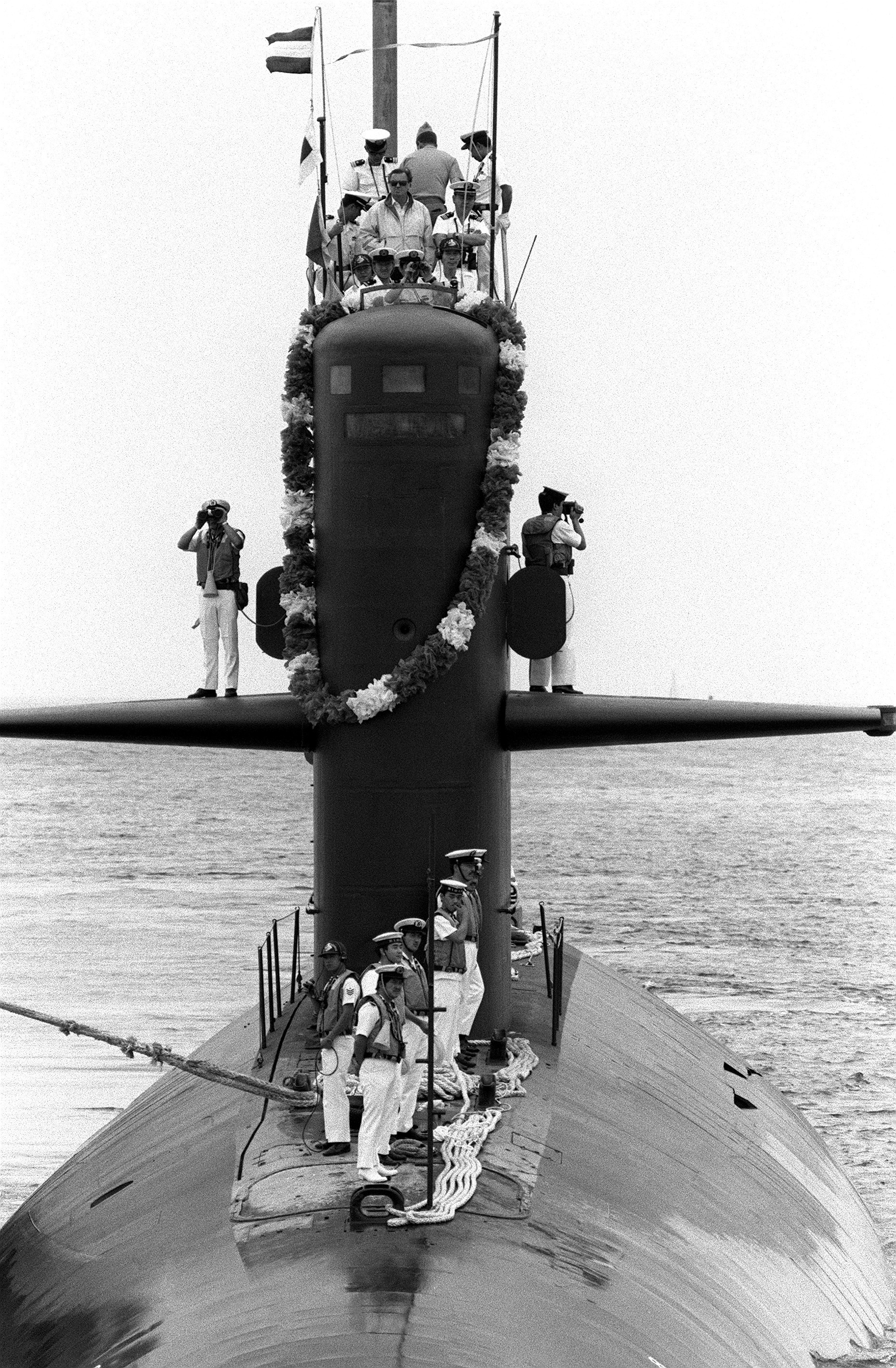

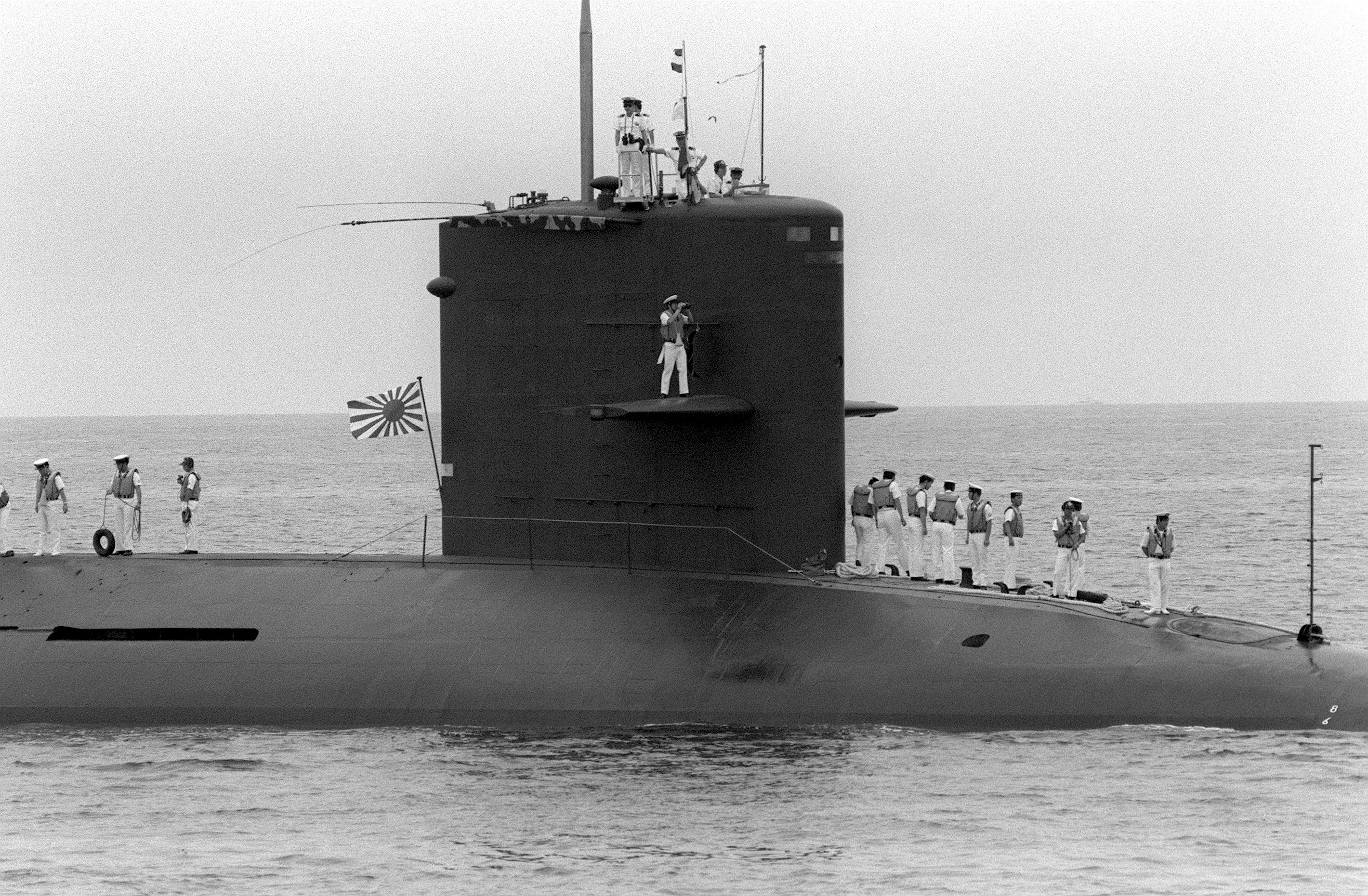
