= Avondale, Louisiana =

- Census-designated place
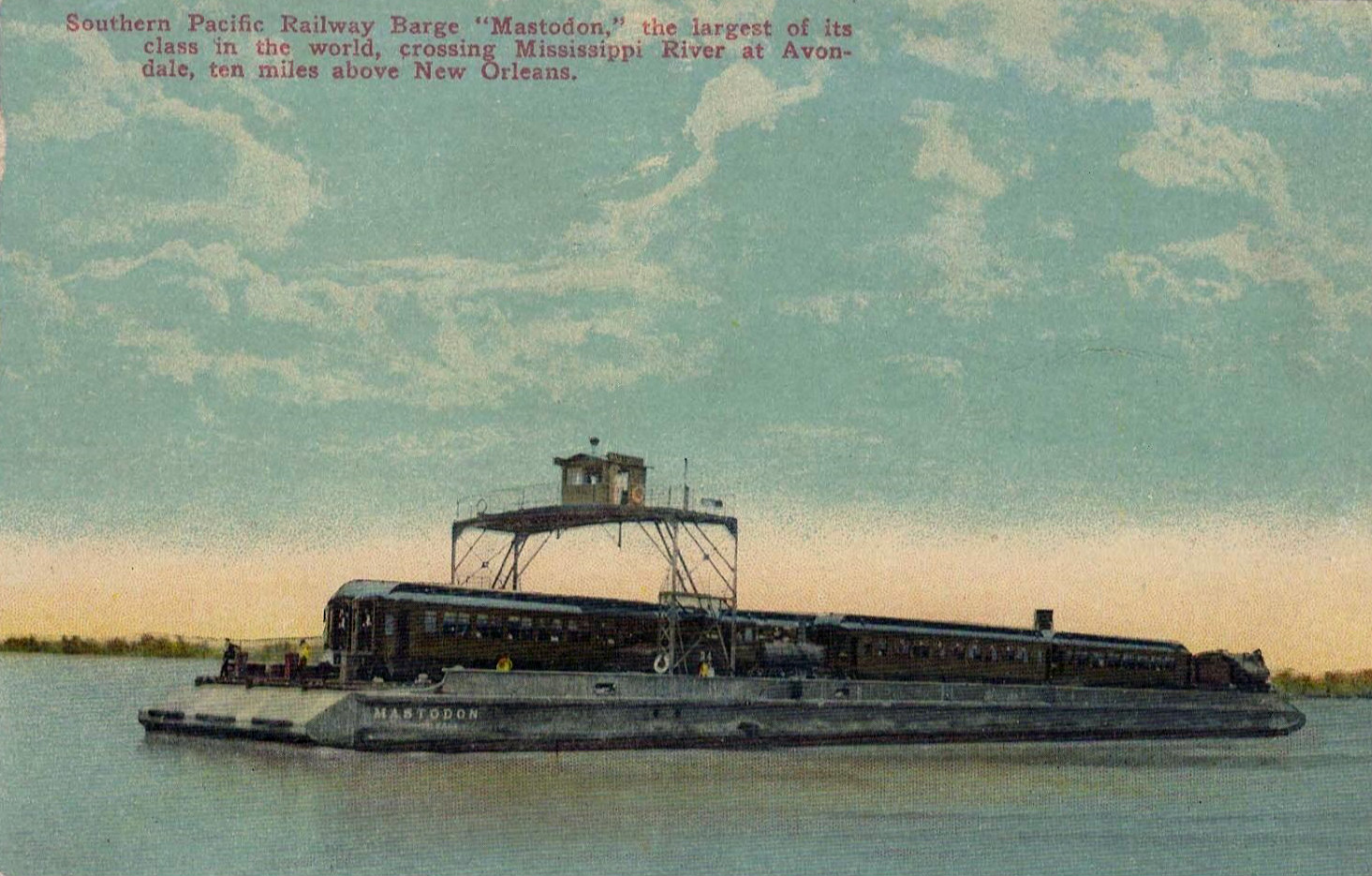
- Postcard photo of the Southern Pacific railroad barge Mastodon crossing the Mississippi River at Avondale, Louisiana. The railroad also had railroad ferries which worked in the San Francisco area for the same purpose.

- Location within Louisiana Location within the United States
- Coordinates: 29°54′16″N 90°12′15″W
- Country: United States
- State: Louisiana
- Parish: Jefferson

Area
  - Total: 5.99 sq mi (15.51 km^{2})
  - Land: 5.56 sq mi (14.39 km^{2})
  - Water: 0.43 sq mi (1.12 km^{2})
- Elevation: 3 ft (0.91 m)

Population (2020)
  - Total: 4,582
  - Density: 824.5/sq mi (318.35/km^{2})
- Time zone: UTC-6 (CST)
  - Summer (DST): UTC-5 (CDT)
- ZIP Code: 70094
- Area code: 504
- FIPS code: 22-03810
- GNIS feature ID: 542944

Avondale is a census-designated place (CDP) in Jefferson Parish, Louisiana, United States, on the west bank of the Mississippi River. The population was 4,582 in 2020. It is part of the New Orleans–Metairie–Kenner metropolitan statistical area.

== Geography ==
Avondale is located at 29°54′16″N 90°12′15″W on the south side ("West Bank") of the Mississippi River. It is bordered to the west by Waggaman and to the east by Bridge City, while to the north, across the Mississippi, it is bordered by the city of Harahan. The closest road crossing of the Mississippi is the Huey P. Long Bridge 4 miles (6 km) northeast of Avondale, carrying U.S. Route 90. Downtown New Orleans is 13 miles (21 km) northeast of Avondale by road.

According to the United States Census Bureau, the Avondale CDP has a total area of 6.0 square miles (15.5 km^{2}), of which 5.6 square miles (14.4 km^{2}) are land and 0.42 square miles (1.1 km^{2}), or 7.23%, are water.

== Demographics ==
Historical population
Census	Pop.	Note	%±
1980	6,699		—
1990	5,813		−13.2%
2000	5,441		−6.4%
2010	4,954		−9.0%
2020	4,582		−7.5%
U.S. Decennial Census; 1950 1960 1970 1980; 1990 2000 2010

Avondale first appeared as a census designated place in the 1980 U.S. census.

=== Racial and ethnic composition ===
Avondale CDP, Louisiana – Racial and ethnic composition Note: the U.S. Census Bureau treats Hispanic/Latino as an ethnic category. This table excludes Latinos from the racial categories and assigns them to a separate category. Hispanics/Latinos may be of any race.
Race / Ethnicity (NH = Non-Hispanic)	Pop 2000	Pop 2010	Pop 2020	% 2000	% 2010	% 2020
White alone (NH)	3,328	2,503	1,894	61.17%	50.52%	41.34%
Black or African American alone (NH)	1,096	1,306	1,444	20.14%	26.36%	31.51%
Native American or Alaska Native alone (NH)	27	20	19	0.50%	0.40%	0.41%
Asian alone (NH)	661	574	494	12.15%	11.59%	10.78%
Native Hawaiian or Pacific Islander alone (NH)	0	2	0	0.00%	0.04%	0.00%
Other race alone (NH)	2	1	16	0.04%	0.02%	0.35%
Mixed race or Multiracial (NH)	66	67	160	1.21%	1.35%	3.49%
Hispanic or Latino (any race)	261	481	555	4.80%	9.71%	12.11%
Total	5,441	4,954	4,582	100.00%	100.00%	100.00%

=== 2020 census ===
According to the 2020 United States census, there were 4,582 people, 1,729 households, and 1,239 families residing in the CDP. The 2019 American Community Survey reported there were 5,321 people and 1,729 households residing in the census-designated place. Of the population in 2019, there were 1,729 households spread among 1,838 housing units. The average family size was 3.72.

In 2019, the racial and ethnic makeup of the CDP was 40.3% non-Hispanic white, 35.4% Black or African American, 15.9% Asian, 1.2% some other race, 0.2% two or more races, and 9.0% Hispanic and Latino American of any race. An estimated 14.0% of its population was foreign-born, and the median age was 36.7. Other than English, 8.3% of the population spoke Spanish, 16.4% Asian and Pacific Islander languages, and 1.8% other Indo-European languages. In 2020, the U.S. Census Bureau tabulated a total racial and ethnic composition of 41.34% non-Hispanic whites, 31.51% Black or African Americans, 0.41% Native Americans, 10.78% Asians, 3.84% other races and ethnicities, and 12.11% Hispanic and Latino American of any race; the census estimates and tabulation have represented the diversification of the U.S. nationwide and its non-Hispanic white demographic decline.

The median income for a household in the CDP was $40,503, up from $35,917 at the 2000 U.S. census; approximately 14.8% of the population lived at or below the poverty line, up from 17.3% in 2000.

== Education ==
Jefferson Parish Public Schools operates public schools.

Most areas of the CDP are zoned to: Gilbert PreK-8 School, formerly Henry Ford Middle School until 2019. A small section is zoned to Cherbonnier K-8 School. All residents are zoned to L.W. Higgins High School in Marrero. In regards to advanced studies academies, residents are zoned to the Marrero Academy and Patrick F. Taylor Science and Technology Academy.

Previously a portion of the community was zoned to Norbert Rillieux Elementary in Waggaman. In 2012 the school board announced Rillieux was being considered for consolidation into Lucille Cherbonnier Elementary. In the 2010s most residents were zoned to Catherine Strehle Elementary School in Avondale and some were zoned to Lucille Cherbonnier/Norbert Rillieux Elementary School in Waggaman. Ford MS served as the zoned middle school.
