= Yūshio-class submarine =

Submarine class

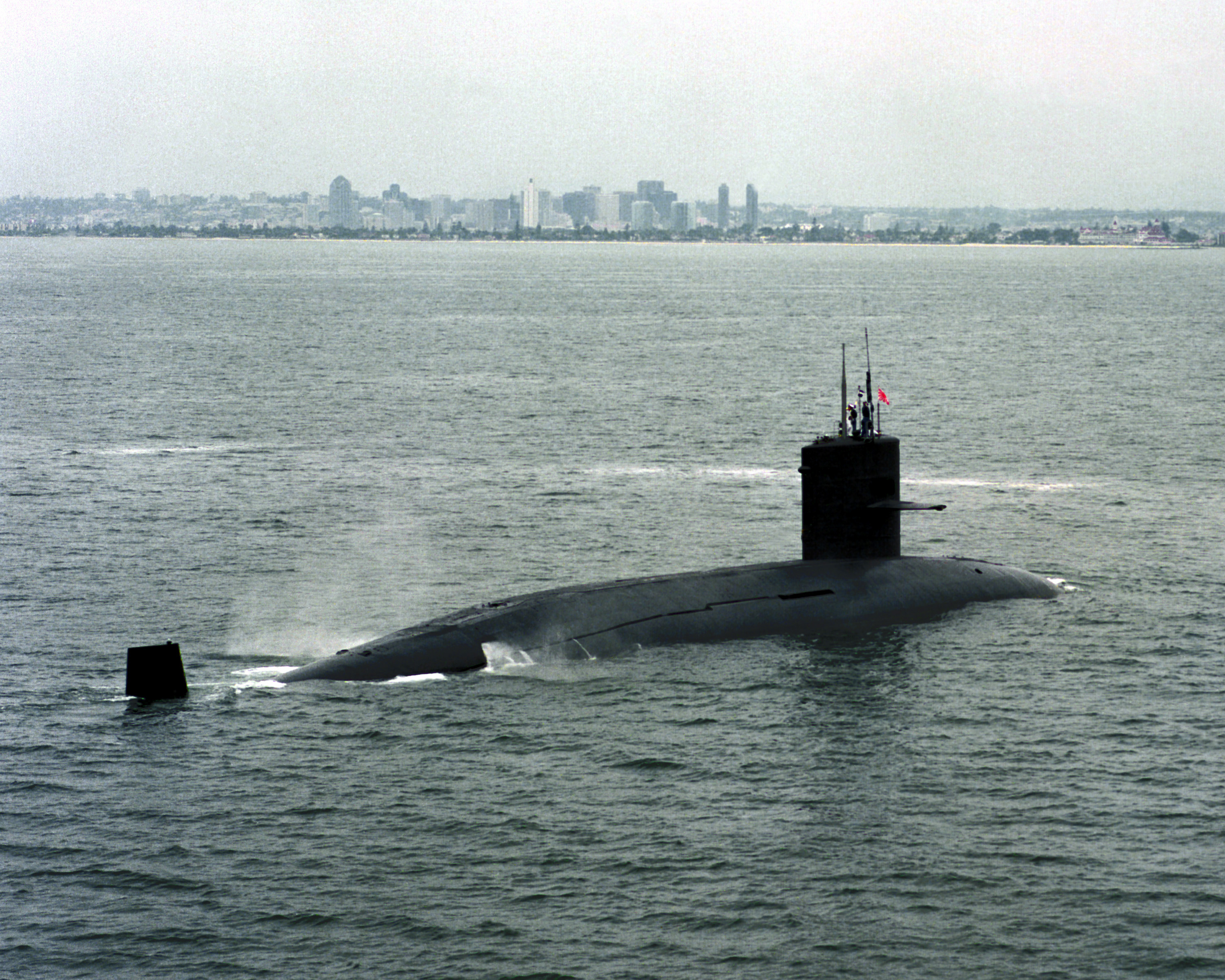
- Mochishio (SS 574), a Yūshio-class submarine enters San Diego Harbor in 1992 to take part in the RIMPAC 92' military exercise

Class overview
- Builders: Mitsubishi Heavy Industries; Kawasaki Shipbuilding Corporation
- Operators: Japan Maritime Self-Defense Force
- Preceded by: Uzushio class
- Succeeded by: Harushio class
- Built: 1976–1989
- In commission: 1980–2008
- Planned: 10
- Completed: 10
- Retired: 10
- Preserved: 1

General characteristics
- Type: Submarine
- Displacement: SS-573 to SS-575; 2,200 tonnes (surfaced); 2,900 tonnes (submerged); SS-576; 2,300 tonnes (surfaced); SS-577 to SS-582; 2,250 tonnes (surfaced)
- Length: 76.0 m (249.3 ft)
- Beam: 9.9 m (32.5 ft)
- Draught: 7.4 m (24.3 ft)
- Propulsion: 1-shaft diesel-electric; 3,400 shp (2,500 kW) (surfaced); 7,200 shp (5,400 kW) (submerged)
- Speed: 12 knots (22 km/h; 14 mph) (surfaced); 20 knots (37 km/h; 23 mph) (submerged)
- Complement: 10 officers; 65–70 enlisted
- Sensors & processing systems: Hughes/Oki ZQQ 5 hull mounted sonar; ZQR 1 Towed array sonar; JRC ZPS 5/6 I-band search radar
- Armament: 6 × 21 in (533 mm) torpedo tubes with 20 reloads for: 1.) Type 89 torpedo; 2.) Type 80 ASW Torpedo; 3.) UGM-84 Harpoon

The Yūshio class was a Japanese diesel-electric submarine class operated by the JMSDF. It was a second generation submarine, a development of the Uzushio class, incorporating a teardrop hull, with a resulting increase in underwater performance on the Uzushio class. Ten were built under the fourth defense plan in 1975 fiscal year. All vessels were retired with the decommissioning of Yukishio on March 7, 2008, and the completion of the Harushio class. JDS Akishio is on display at the JMSDF Kure Museum.

== Boats ==
Project no.	Building no.	Pennant no.	Name	Laid down	Launched	Commissioned	Fate
S122	8088	SS-573/ ATSS-8006	Yūshio (ゆうしお)	3 December 1976	29 March 1979	26 February 1980	Converted to auxiliary training submarine (ATSS-8006) on 1 August 1996, decommissioned 11 March 1999, scrapped
S122	8089	SS-574/ ATSS-8007	Mochishio (もちしお)	9 May 1978	12 March 1980	5 March 1981	Converted to auxiliary training submarine (ATSS-8007) on 1 August 1997, decommissioned 10 March 2000, scrapped
S122	8090	SS-575/ ATSS-8008/ TSS-3602	Setoshio (せとしお)	17 April 1979	10 February 1981	17 March 1982	Converted to auxiliary training submarine (ATSS-8008) on 10 March 1999, re-converted to training submarine (TSS-3602) on 9 March 2000, decommissioned 30 March 2001, scrapped
S122	8091	SS-576/ TSS-3603	Okishio (おきしお)	17 April 1980	5 March 1982	1 March 1983	Converted to training submarine (TSS-3603) on 29 March 2001, decommissioned 4 March 2003, scrapped
S123	8092	SS-577	Nadashio (なだしお)	16 April 1981	27 January 1983	6 March 1984	Decommissioned 1 June 2001, scrapped
S123	8093	SS-578/ TSS-3604	Hamashio (はましお)	8 April 1982	1 February 1984	5 March 1985	Converted to training submarine (TSS-3604) on 9 March 2000, decommissioned 9 March 2006, scrapped
S123	8094	SS-579	Akishio (あきしお)	15 April 1983	21 January 1985	5 March 1986	Decommissioned 3 March 2004, displayed at JMSDF Kure Museum from 5 April 2007
S123	8095	SS-580	Takeshio (たけしお)	3 April 1984	9 February 1986	3 March 1987	Decommissioned 9 March 2005, scrapped
S123	8096	SS-581/ TSS-3605	Yukishio (ゆきしお)	11 April 1985	23 January 1987	11 March 1988	Converted to training submarine (TSS-3605) on 9 March 2006, decommissioned 7 March 2008, scrapped
S123	8097	SS-582	Sachishio (さちしお)	11 April 1986	17 February 1988	24 March 1989	Decommissioned 14 April 2006, scrapped

== Gallery ==
Akishio photographs

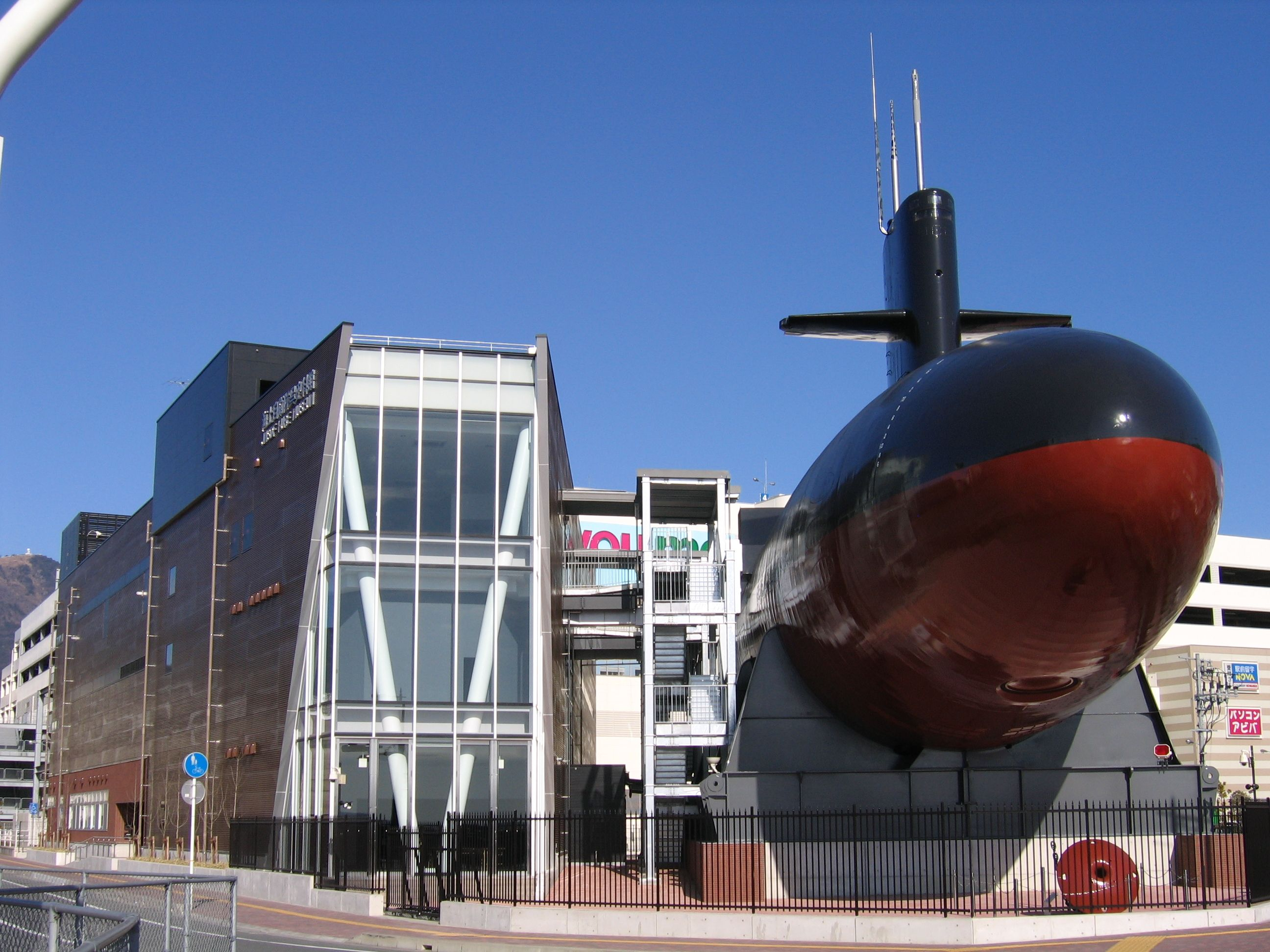
Akishio at JMSDF Kure Museum

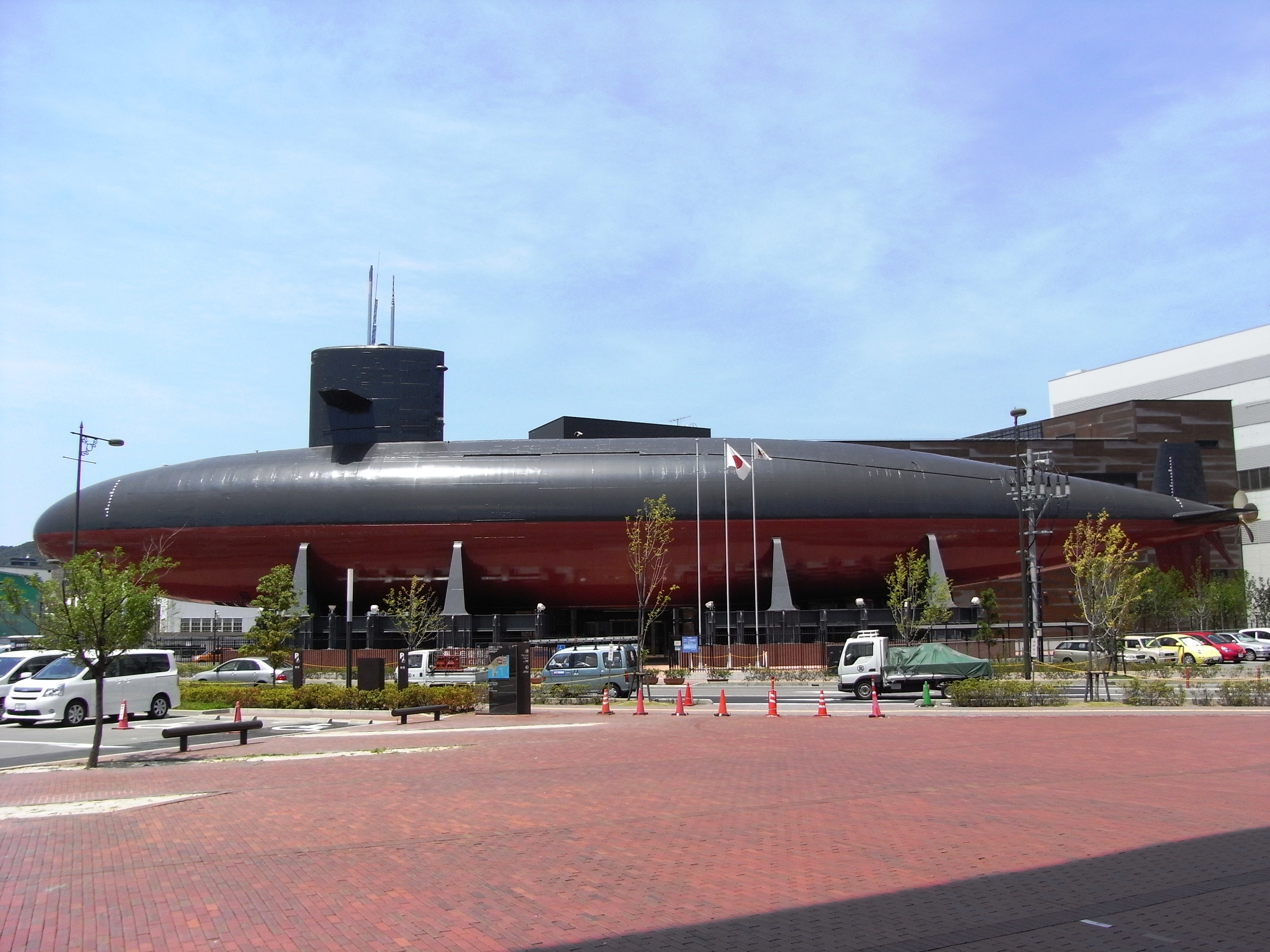
Akishio at JMSDF Kure Museum

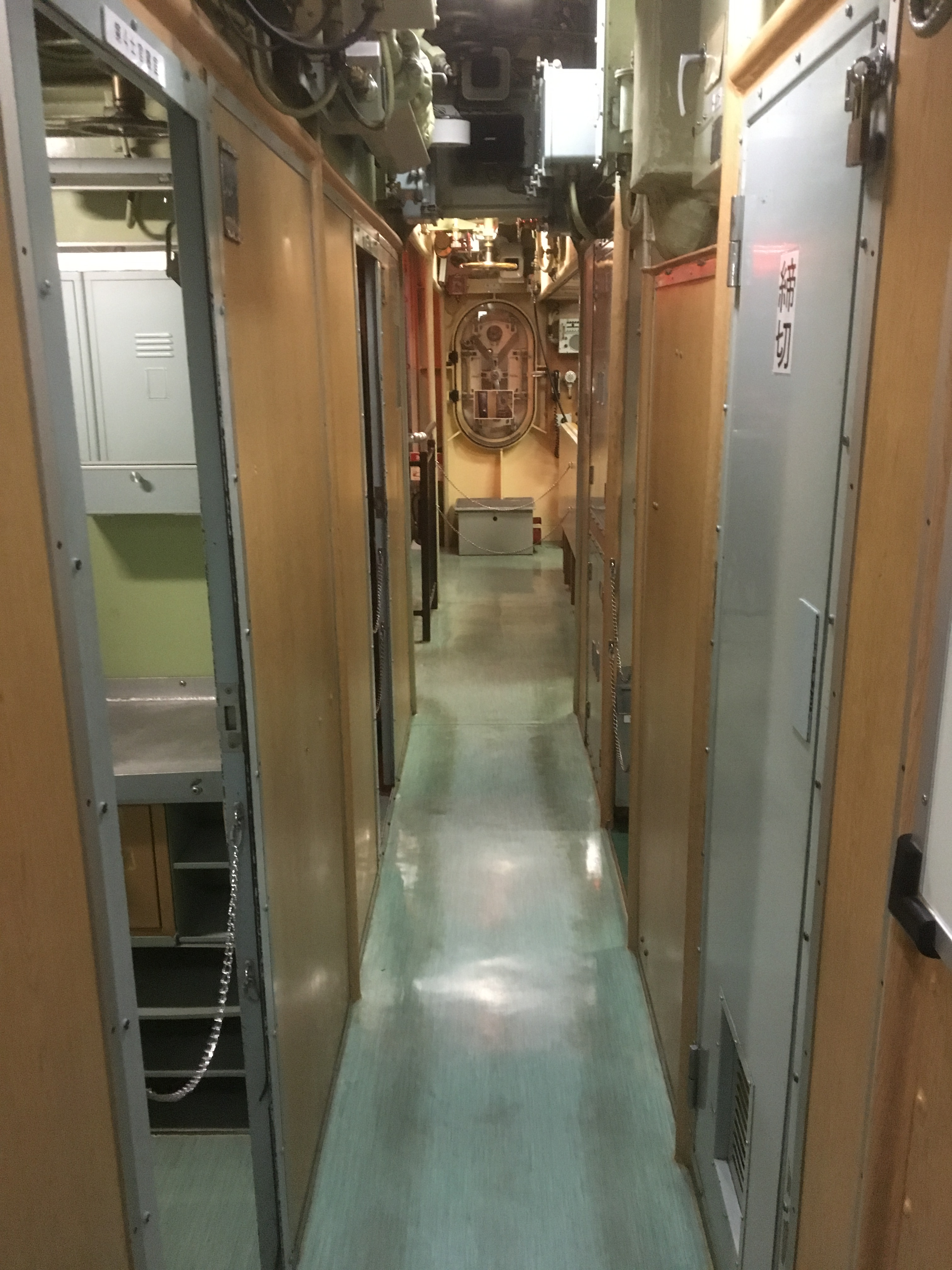
Passageway

== See also ==
Equivalent submarines of the same era

- Tango class
- Zwaardvis class
- Vela class
- Type 035A
