= Dalmatia under Venetian rule =

Parts of the historical region of Dalmatia under the rule of the Venetian Republic

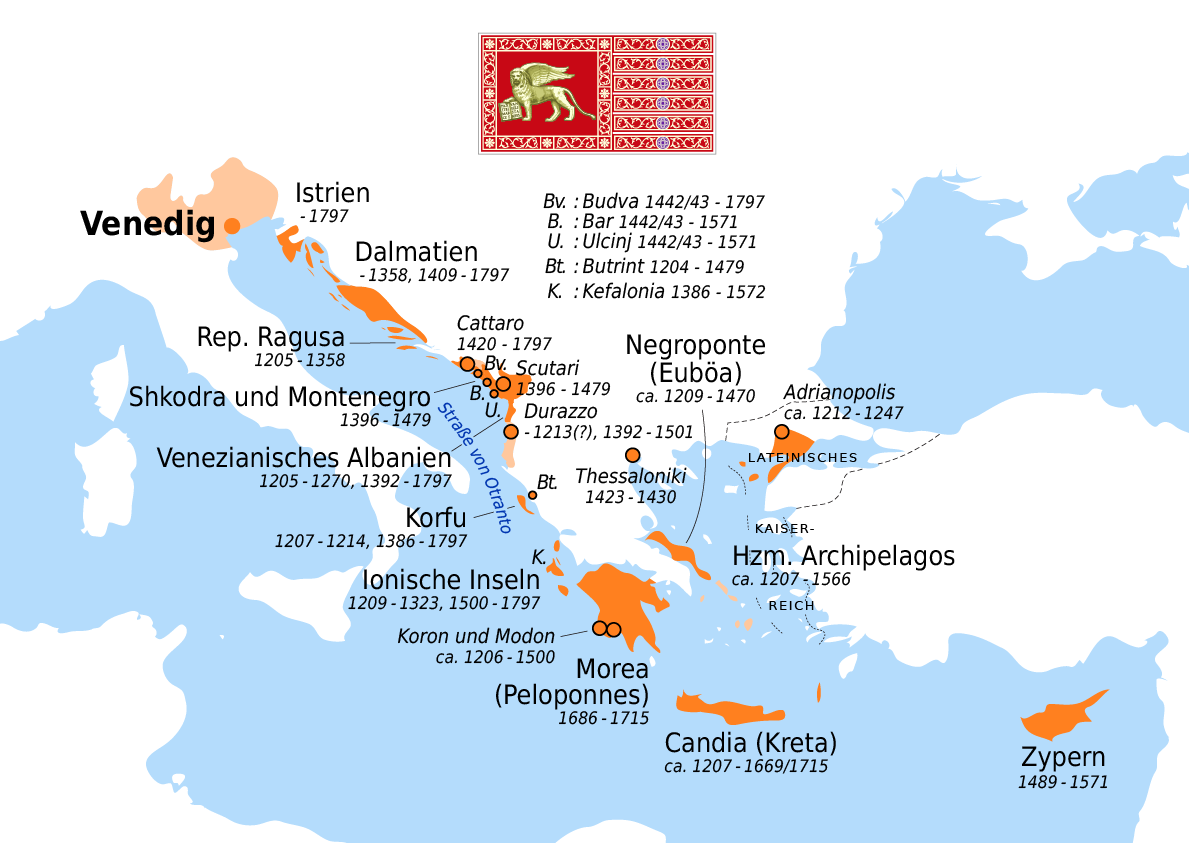
Map of Stato da Màr, the Venetian overseas domains.

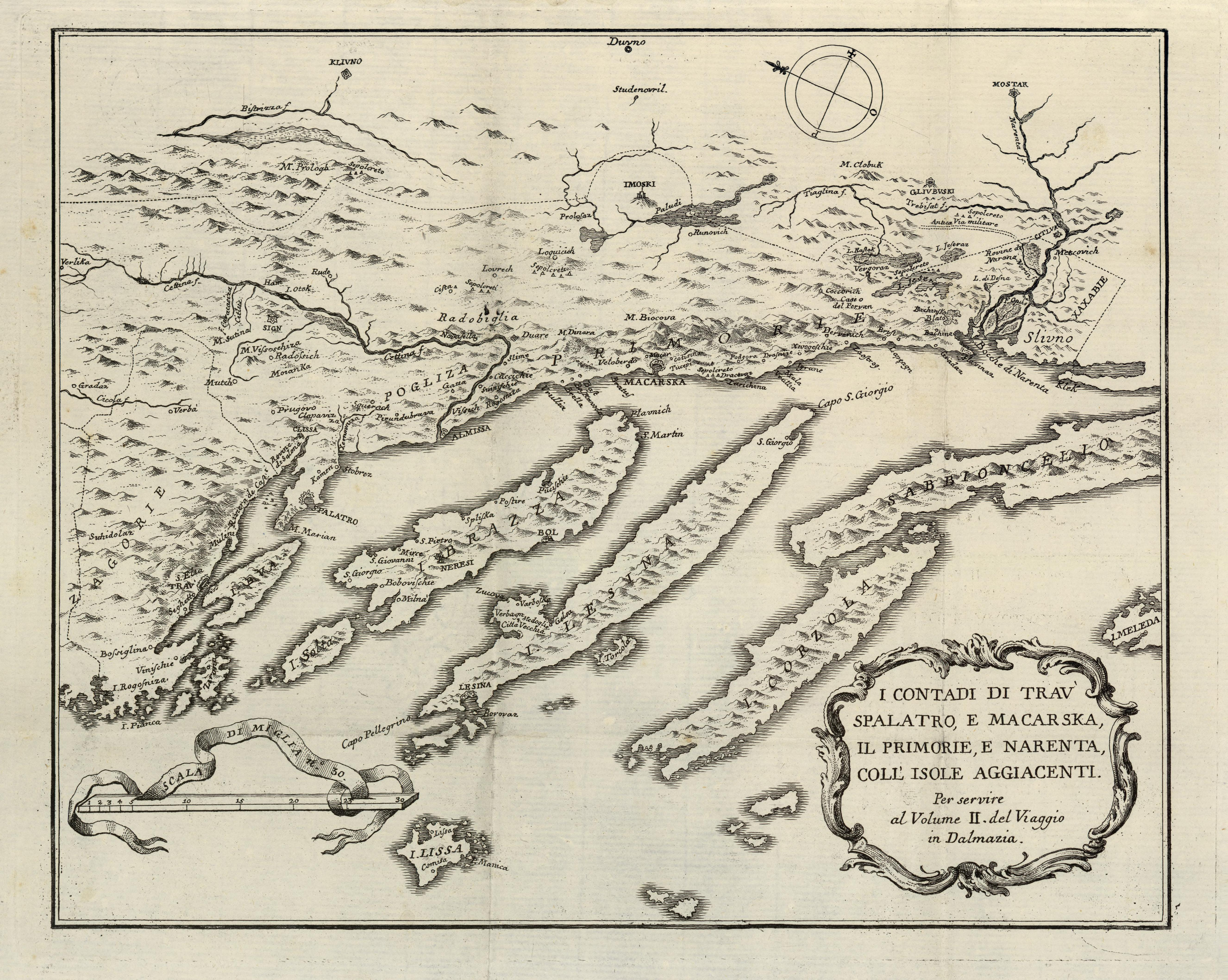
Illustration of area between Trogir and Pelješac, depicting a portion of the Venetian territories, taken from the 1774 book Viaggio in Dalmazia by Alberto Fortis.

The Republic of Venice ruled parts of Dalmatia between 1409 and 1797, following earlier periods of Venetian control over numerous Dalmatian cities and islands dating back to around 1000 AD.

From the 7th to the 14th century, the Venetians waged wars against the Croats for dominance over the eastern Adriatic coast, acquiring their first possessions in the 11th century.

Venetian rule over the eastern Adriatic was fully consolidated in 1420, when Dalmatia was incorporated as a geographical region of the Stato da Màr (lit. State of the Sea). The administration was organised through magistrate-led cities, overseen by the Provveditore Generale in Dalmazia e Albania, who was usually based in Zadar.

Following the Ottoman conquests of the Dalmatian Hinterland, by the late 18th century, the geographical term Dalmatia had come to refer solely to the territory under Venetian rule. In 1797, Napoleon dissolved the Republic of Venice, and its Dalmatian territories were annexed by the Habsburg Monarchy.

== History ==
=== Background ===
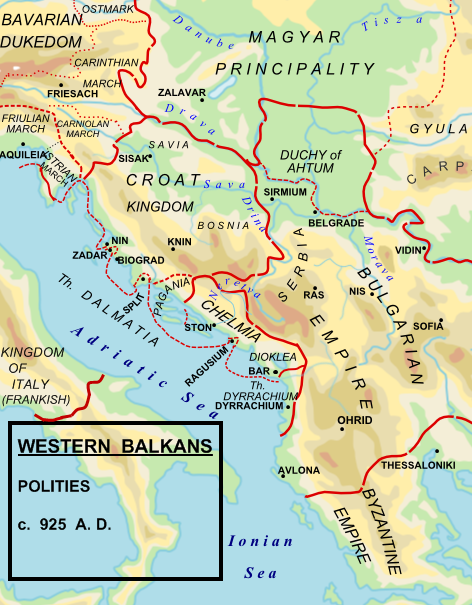
The Kingdom of Croatia and Byzantine Dalmatia (theme) c. 925.

Conflicts between Venetians and Croats, as well as other Slavic nations or tribes on the Adriatic coast, including Narentines, began very early, in the 7th and 8th century, because the Venetians demanded free passage for their merchant galleys and did not want to pay taxes. By the mid-9th century was formed Byzantine theme of Dalmatia limited to the islands and coastal cities of the Dalmatian city-states (Zadar, Split, Cres, Rab, Trogir, Krk, Dubrovnik, Kotor), hence, the medieval region of Dalmatia was a wide and long sea area of Eastern Adriatic, but with a very narrow coastline land area. Nearby the coastline and in its hinterland the control and influence was in the hands of Slavs, mostly Croatian dukes and kings who had royal courts at Klis near Split, Bijaći near Trogir, Knin, Nin, and Biograd na Moru among others.

Beginning with Doge Pietro II Orseolo, who ruled Venice from 991 AD, Venetian attention towards mainland Veneto was definitely overshadowed by a strong push towards the control of the Adriatic Sea. Inner strife was pacified, and trade with the Byzantine Empire boosted by the favourable treaty (Grisobolus or Golden Bull) with Emperor Basil II. The imperial edict granted Venetian traders freedom from the Kommerkion tax paid by other foreigners and the Byzantines themselves. In 1000 AD an expedition of Venetian ships in coastal Istria and Dalmatia secured Venetian suzerainty in the area, and the Narentine pirates were suppressed permanently. On this occasion Doge Orseolo named himself "Duke of Dalmatia", starting the colonial empire of Venice. He was also responsible of the establishment of the famous "Marriage of the Sea" ceremony. At this time Venice had a firm control over the Adriatic Sea, strengthened by the expedition of Pietro's son Ottone in 1017. From the 1030s however, after the fall of Doge Otto Orseolo, Croatian kings Stjepan I and his son Petar Krešimir IV succeeded in taking almost the whole coast back, so the latter carried the title King of Croatia and Dalmatia.

During the 1074 invasion of the Normans died Petar Krešimir IV, and in February 1075 the Venetians banished the Normans and secured the Dalmatian cities for themselves. The doge Domenico Selvo self-titled himself as the doge of "Venice, Dalmatia and Croatia" (later only of "Dalmatia"), but did not have nominal power over Dalmatia and Croatia. In October 1075 was crowned Demetrius Zvonimir as the king of "Croatia and Dalmatia" by the Holy See and his power was felt even on the islands of Krk and Cres. His death in 1089 caused succession crisis in Croatia and Dalmatia, but although doge Vitale I Michiel made with Coloman, King of Hungary agreement of 1098—the so-called Conventio Amicitiae—determined the spheres of interest of each party by allotting the coastal regions of Croatia to Hungary and Dalmatia to the Republic of Venice, Coloman in 1105 successfully conquered coastal cities of Dalmatia.

During the 12th century, after Croatia entered a personal union with the Kingdom of Hungary, kings Coloman and Béla II managed to return a considerable territory of Dalmatia and Croatian Littoral to their kingdom, but occasional conflicts almost never ceased. The creation of Venice's overseas empire began with the conquest of Dalmatia and reached its greatest nominal extent at the conclusion of the Fourth Crusade in 1204, with the declaration of the acquisition of three octaves of the Byzantine Empire. Venice with the help of crusaders captured Zadar in 1202. In 1203, Pope Innocent III excommunicated the entire crusading army, along with the Venetians, for taking part in the attack. After wintering in Zadar, the Fourth Crusade continued its campaign, which led to the siege of Constantinople. Hungarian king Louis the Great launched a large campaign in 1356–1358 and forced Venice to withdraw from Dalmatia. Zadar Peace Treaty was signed on 18 February 1358 and Venice lost influence over whole coast from eastern Istria to southern Dalmatia.

=== Formation ===
In 1409, during the 20-year Hungarian civil war between King Sigismund and the Neapolitan House of Anjou, the losing contender, Ladislaus of Naples, sold his rights on Dalmatia to the Venetian Republic for a meager sum of 100,000 ducats. Sigismund tried to recover the territory but Venice defeated his troops in the Battle of Motta (1412). Croatian Littoral and eastern Istria remained parts of Croatia, where Croats, together with their allies, rejected Venetian efforts to subject them. The more centralized merchant republic took control of the coastal cities by 1420 (with the exception of the Republic of Ragusa); they were to remain under Venetian rule for a period of 377 years (1420–1797). The southernmost area of Dalmatia (now part of coastal Montenegro) was called Venetian Albania during that time.

=== Ottoman–Venetian Wars ===
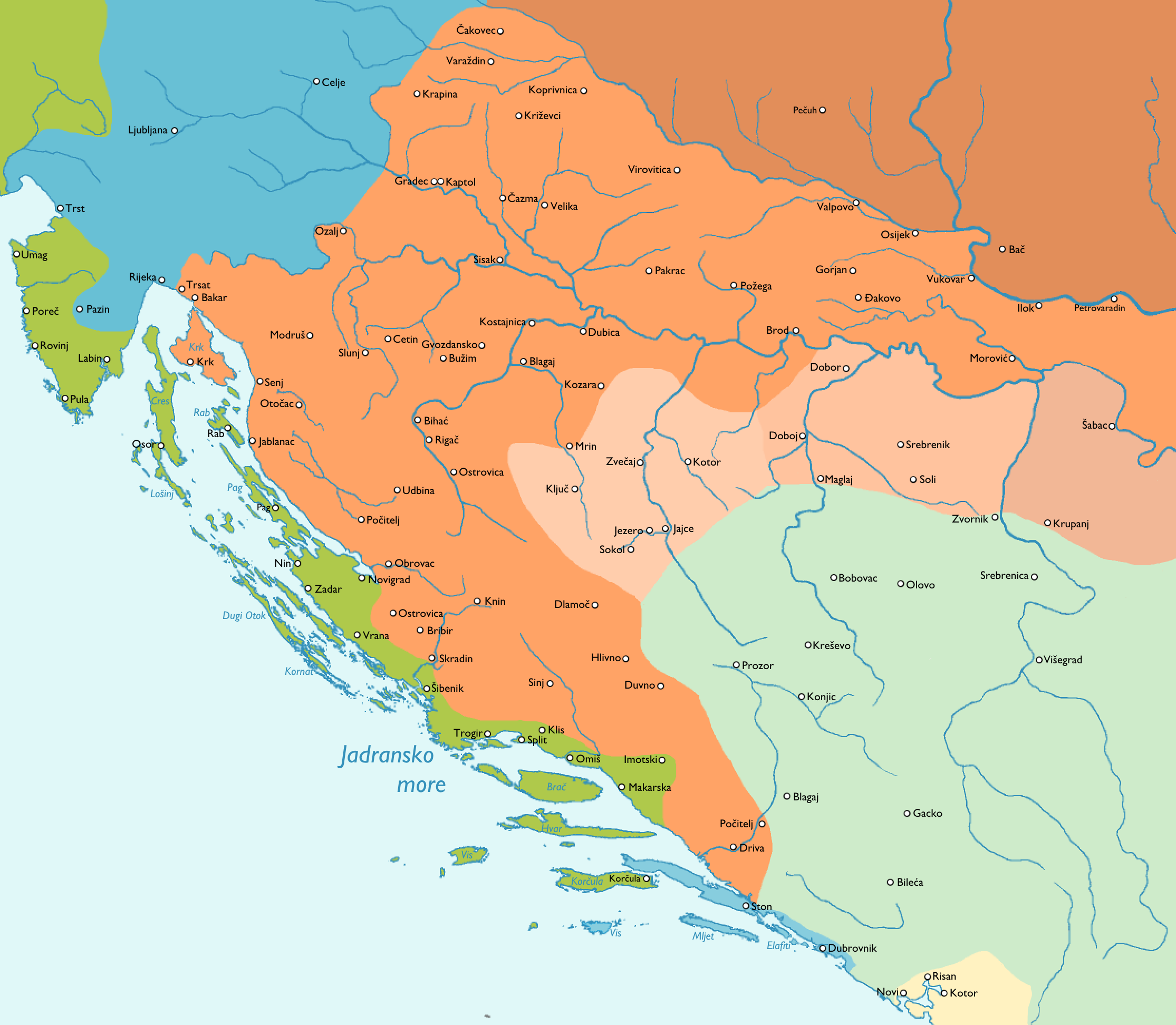
Venetian Dalmatia in 1469.

Venetian Dalmatia in 1500.

Venetian Dalmatia in 1558.

In the period between the start of the Ottoman–Venetian War (1499–1503) and the end of Ottoman–Venetian War (1537–40), the Ottoman Empire made significant advances in the Dalmatian hinterland - it did not occupy the Venetian cities, but it took the Croatian possessions between Skradin and Obrovac (forming Croatian vilayet and then Sanjak of Klis), eliminating them as a buffer zone between the Ottoman and Venetian territory. Venetians still perceived this inner hinterland as once part of Croatia calling it as "Banadego" (lands of Ban i.e. Banate). The economy of the Venetian cities in Dalmatia, severely impacted by the Turkish occupation of the hinterland in the previous war, recovered and held steady even throughout this war.

During the entire duration of Venetian rule, Dalmatians served in Venetian military as professional soldiers (naval personnel, oltramarini infantry and cappelletti cavalry) and conscripts (galliots and cernida militia). They fought on all fronts, from Cyprus to Terraferma and were led by local military elite. During the Battle of Lepanto more than 9000 Dalmatians served on Venetian fleet, in the 1680s 3000 oltramarini formed the core of admiral Francesco Morosini invasion force during the Morean war, and finally during the last days of the Republic it was the Dalmatian contingent of around 11,000 soldiers and sailors that stood against Napoleons armies.

=== Uskok war ===
The Uskok War was fought by the Austrians, Slovenes, Croats, and Spanish on one side and the Venetians, Dutch, and English on the other. It is named for the Uskoks, soldiers from Croatia used by the Austrians for irregular warfare. Since the Uskoks were checked on land and were rarely paid their annual salary, they resorted to piracy. In addition to attacking Turkish ships, they attacked Venetian merchantmen. The conflict began in January 1616 in the Gorizia Hills and lasted until 1617. The Treaty of Peace (now known as the Preliminary Treaty of Paris and the Treaty of Madrid) resolved that pirates would be driven from the maritime areas of the House of Habsburg. The Venetians returned to Austrians all the places occupied by them in Istria and Friuli.

=== Cretan War ===
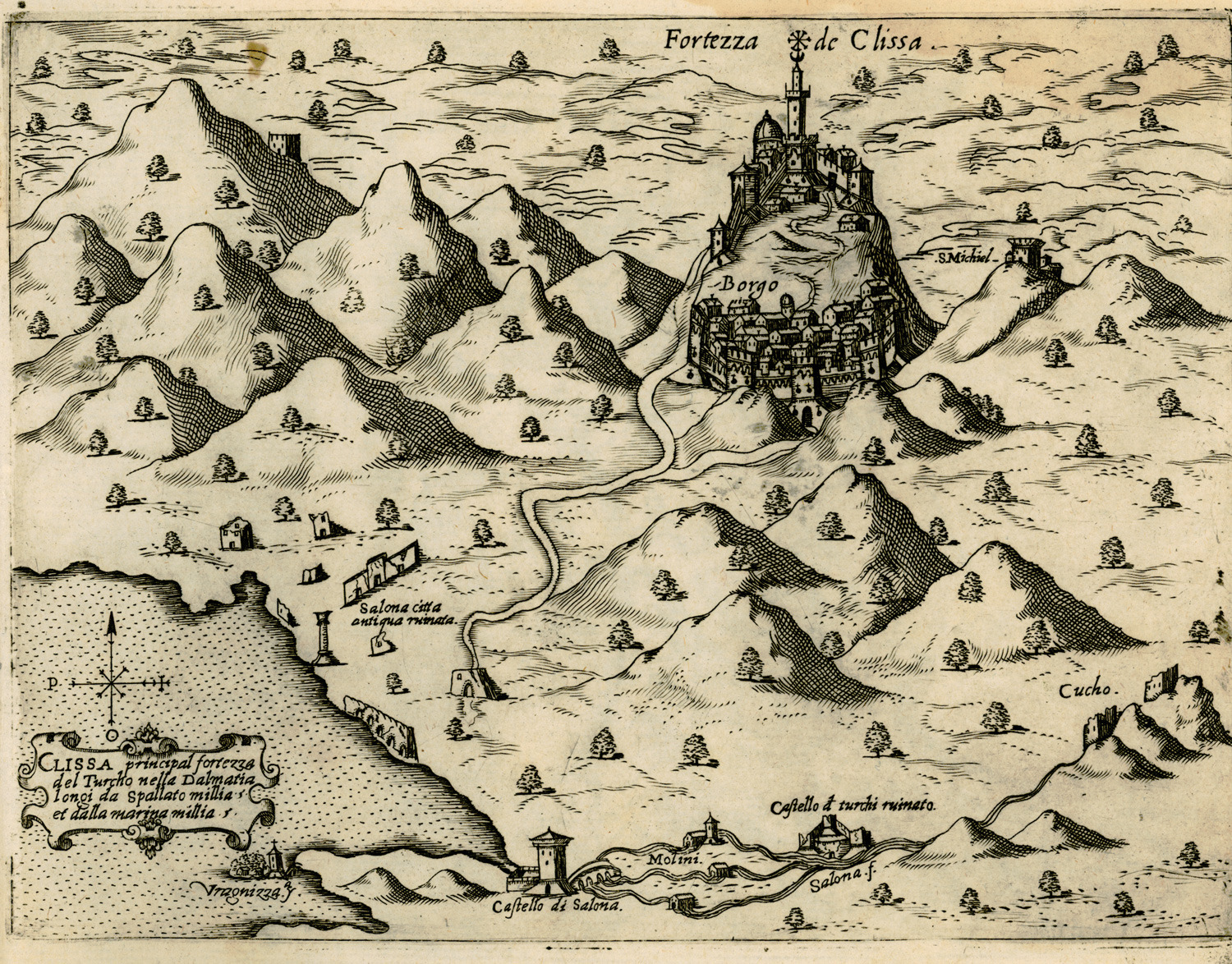
During the Candian War, the Venetians in Dalmatia with the support of the local population managed to compel the Ottoman garrison of Klis Fortress to surrender.

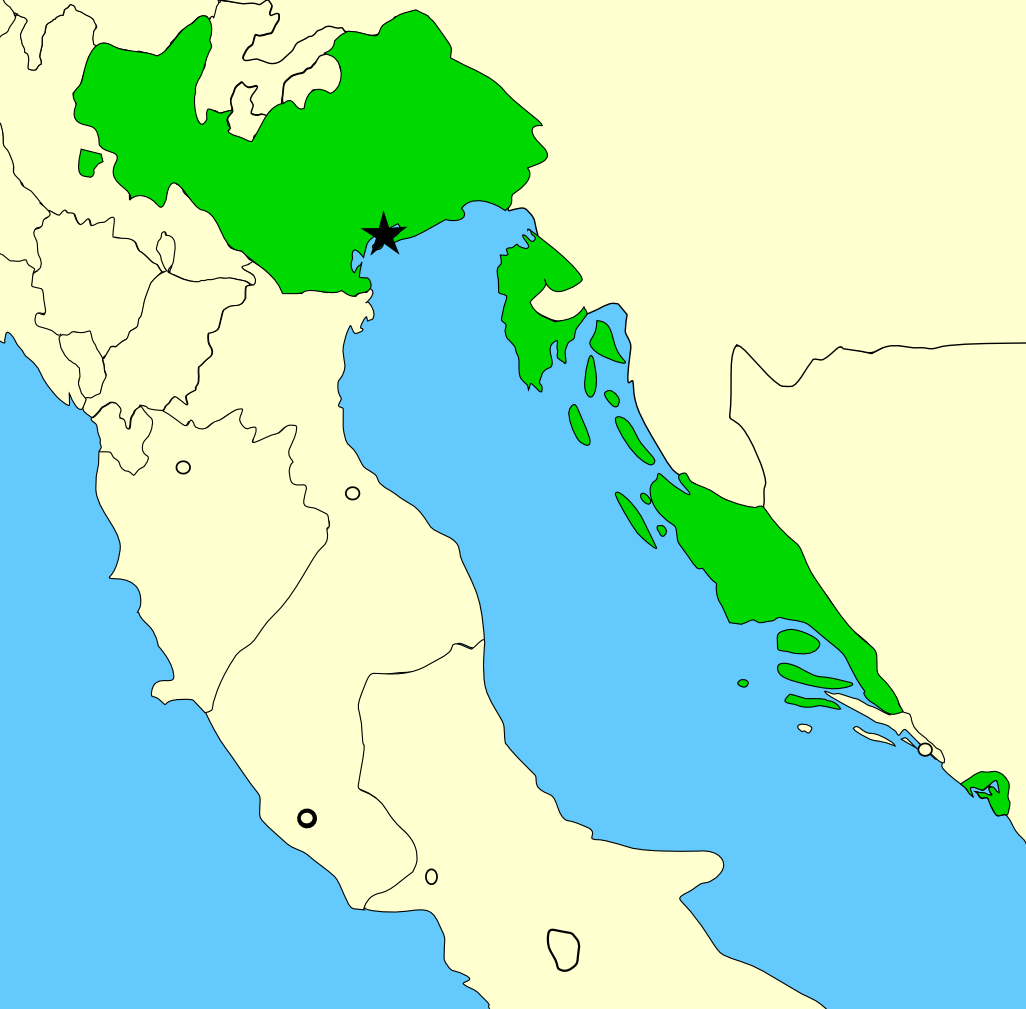
The maximum extent of Dalmatian possessions of the Republic of Venice in 1797.

The Dalmatian front was a separate theater of operations, which was involved in the early phase of the war. The conditions there were almost reverse to those in Crete: for the Ottomans, it was too far away and relatively insignificant, while the Venetians operated near their own bases of supply and had undisputed control of the sea, being thus able to easily reinforce their coastal strongholds. The Ottomans launched a large-scale attack in 1646, and made some significant gains, including the capture of the islands of Krk, Pag and Cres, and most importantly, the supposedly impregnable fortress of Novigrad, which surrendered on 4 July, after only two days of bombardment. The Turks were now able to threaten the two main Venetian strongholds in Dalmatia, Zadar and Split. In the next year however, the tide turned, as the Venetian commander Leonardo Foscolo seized several forts, retook Novigrad, temporarily captured the fortress of Knin and took Klis, while a month-long siege of the fortress of Šibenik by the Ottomans in August and September failed. During the next few years, military operations stalled because of an outbreak of famine and plague amongst the Venetians at Zadar, while both sides focused their resources in the Aegean area. As other fronts took priority for the Ottomans, no further operations occurred in the Dalmatian theater. Peace in 1669 found the Republic of Venice with significant gains in Dalmatia, its territory tripled, and its control of the Adriatic thus secured.

=== Morean War ===
In October 1683, the population of Venetian Dalmatia, principally Uskoks of Ravni Kotari, took arms and together with the rayah (lower class) of the Ottoman frontier regions rose up, taking Skradin, Karin, Vrana, Benkovac and Obrovac.

In the Morean War, the Republic of Venice besieged Sinj in October 1684 and then again March and April 1685, but both times without success. In the 1685 attempt, the Venetian armies were aided by the local militia of the Republic of Poljica, who thereby rebelled against their nominal Ottoman suzerainty that had existed since 1513. In an effort to retaliate to Poljica, in June 1685, the Ottomans attacked Zadvarje, and in July 1686 Dolac and Srijane, but were pushed back, and suffered major casualties. With the help of the local population of Poljica as well as the Morlachs, the fortress of Sinj finally fell to the Venetian army on 30 September 1686. On 1 September 1687 the siege of Herceg Novi started, and ended with a Venetian victory on 30 September. Knin was taken after a twelve-day siege on 11 September 1688. The capture of the Knin Fortress marked the end of the successful Venetian campaign to expand their territory in inland Dalmatia, and it also determined much of the final border between Dalmatia and Bosnia and Herzegovina that stands today. The Ottomans would besiege Sinj again in the Second Morean War, but would be repelled.

On 26 November 1690, Venice took Vrgorac, which opened the route towards Imotski and Mostar. In 1694 they managed to take areas north of the Republic of Ragusa, namely Čitluk, Gabela, Zažablje, Trebinje, Popovo, Klobuk and Metković. In the final peace treaty, Venice did relinquish the areas of Popovo polje as well as Klek and Sutorina, to maintain the pre-existing demarcation near Ragusa.

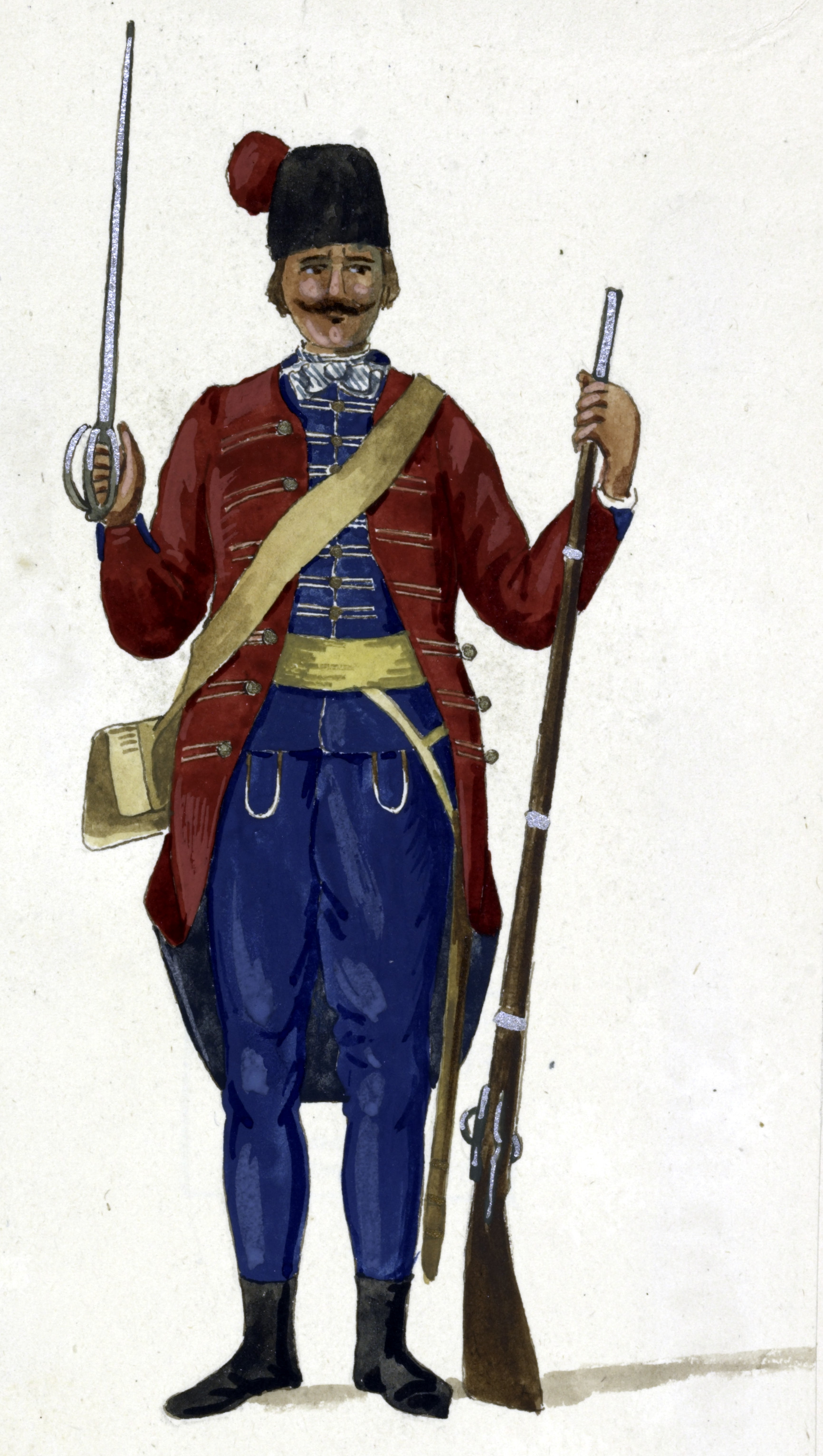
An 18th century Dalmatian marine, oltramarine.

The "Linea Mocenigo" in 1718 Dalmatia was named after Sebastiano Mocenigo, one of the last famous Doges of Venice. Indeed, in Dalmatia -after the Treaty of Passarowitz- he obtained some small advances for Venice, taking the areas of Sinj and Imotski in the hinterland. That was the last enlargement of Venetian Dalmatia (that partially enjoyed the "Age of Enlightment" experienced by Venice) until the Napoleonic conquest in 1797. However, Venetians lost Čitluk and Gabela to Ottomans according to this treaty.

=== End and aftermath ===
The Republic of Venice was dissolved in 1797 by Napoleon Bonaparte, after which its territories were divided between French First Republic and the Habsburg monarchy. The Venetian possessions in Dalmatia were annexed by the Habsburgs.

Subsequently, the area was ceded to the French client state Kingdom of Italy in 1805, and in 1809 it came under the direct control of the First French Empire and was incorporated into the Illyrian Provinces. After the final defeat of Napoleon, the Illyrian Provinces were annexed by the Austrian Empire in 1815 and Kingdom of Dalmatia was created.

== Legacy ==
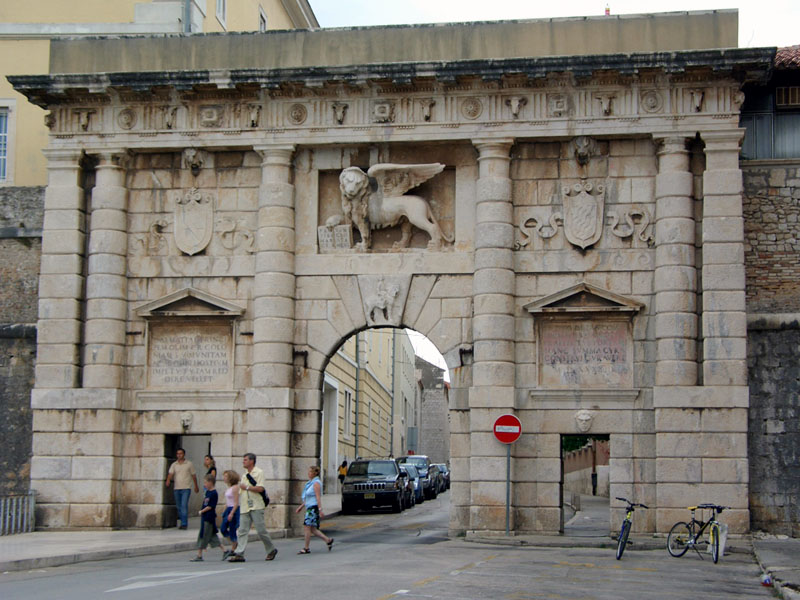
The UNESCO protected Land Gate in Zadar.

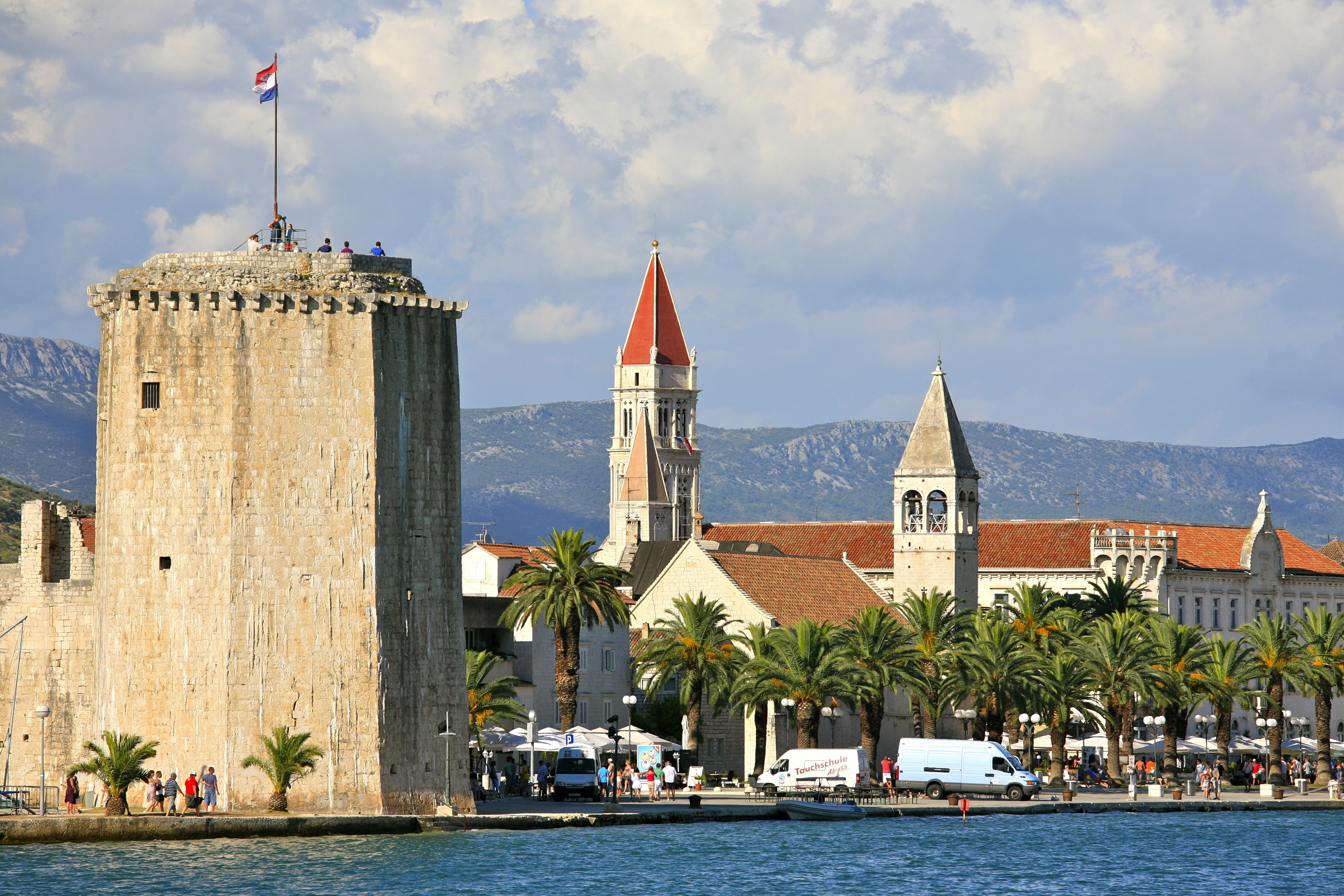
Kamerlengo Castle in Trogir.

The legacy of the Republic of Venice is great.

== See also ==
- Venetian Albania
- Republic of Venice
- Stato da Màr

== Sources ==
- Čoralić, Lovorka (2001). "Boka kotorska u doba Morejskoga rata (1684–1699)". Kolo (in Croatian) (3). Matica hrvatska. ISSN 1331-0992. Archived from the original on 2011-05-19.
- Ivetic, Egidio (2022). Povijest Jadrana: More i njegove civilizacije [History of the Adriatic: A Sea and Its Civilization] (in Croatian and English). Srednja Europa, Polity Press. ISBN 9789538281747.
- Nazor, Ante (February 2002). "Poljičani u Morejskom ratu (1684.-1699.)" [Inhabitants of Poljica in the War of Morea (1684–1699)]. Povijesni Prilozi (in Croatian). 21 (21). Croatian Institute of History. ISSN 0351-9767.
- Nicolle, David (1989), The Venetian Empire, 1200–1670, Osprey Publishing, ISBN 978-0-85045-899-2
- Setton, Kenneth Meyer (1991), Venice, Austria, and the Turks in the Seventeenth Century, DIANE Publishing, ISBN 0-87169-192-2
