= Oltremarini =

Oltremarini regiments Reggimenti Oltramarini Schiavoni
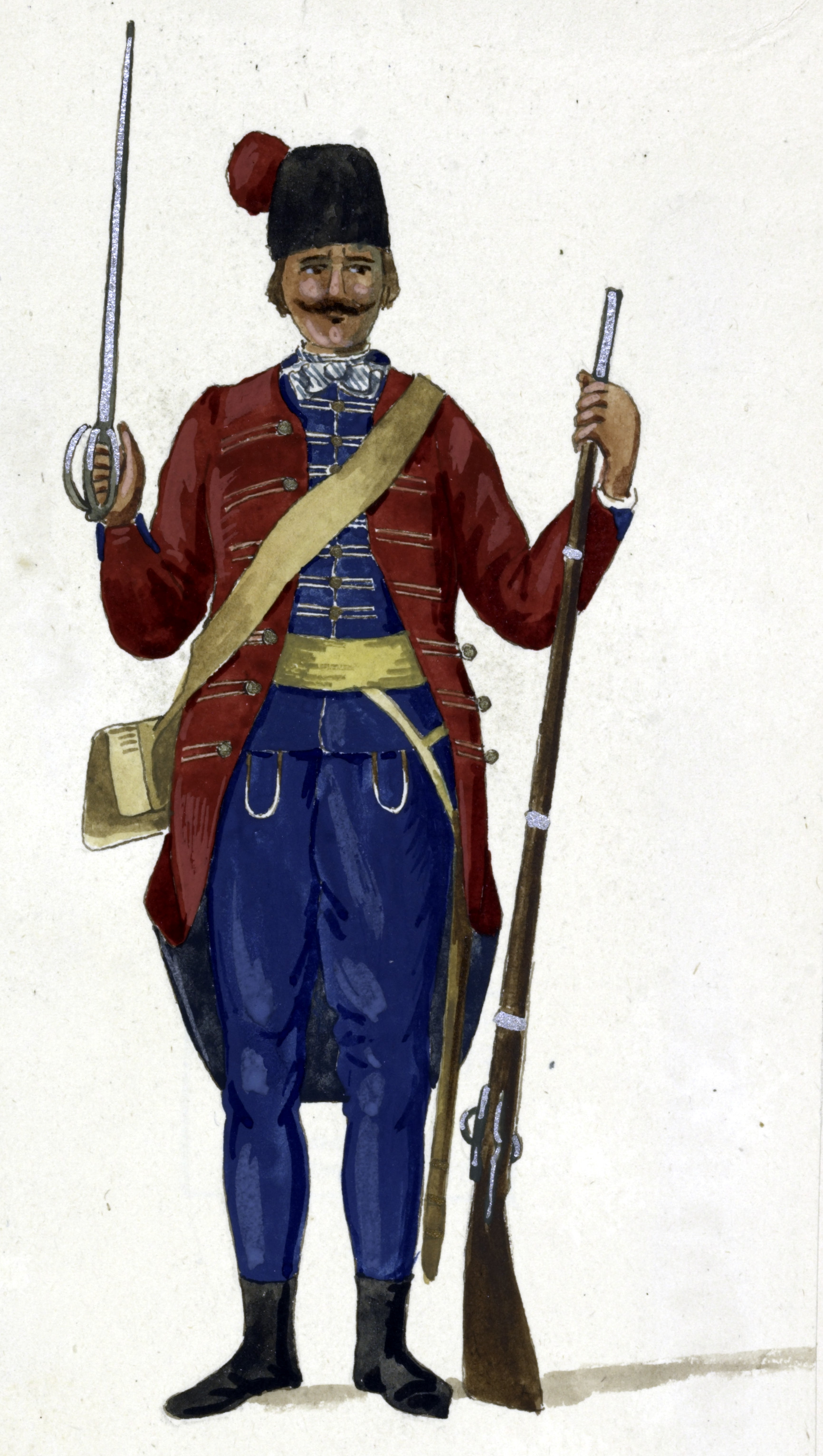
- 18th-century member of the Oltremarini
- Founded: 15th century
- Disbanded: 12 May 1797
- Country: Republic of Venice
- Type: Marines
- Size: 11 regiments of around 6000 men In war up to 10,000; 17,000 (1650); 11,000 (1797)
- Headquarters: Zadar
- Nickname: "Fedelissimi Schiavoni"
- Patron: Jerome
- Mottos: Viva San Marco; Per mar e per terra Ti con nu, nu con ti
- Colors: Dark blue Scarlet
- Anniversaries: Battle of Lepanto (7 October)
- Wars: See list: Battle of Gallipoli (1416); Wars in Lombardy; Ottoman–Venetian War (1463–1479); Wars in Lombardy; Milanese War of Succession; Italian War of 1494–1495; Ottoman–Venetian War (1499–1503); Ottoman–Venetian War (1537–1540); Ottoman–Venetian War (1570–1573); Uskok War; Cretan War (1645–1669); Morean War; Ottoman–Venetian War (1714–1718); Venetian bombardments of the Beylik of Tunis; French Revolutionary Wars; Fall of the Republic of Venice

The Oltramarini or Schiavoni regiments (Italian: Reggimenti Oltramarini/Schiavoni) comprised the overseas infantry of the Republic of Venice. They were a Dalmatian infantry corps organized within the Venetian navy as the elite infantry. They especially stood out in the wars against the Ottoman Empire throughout the Venetian overseas possessions, but also for their service in Terraferma, the Venetian possessions in the hinterland of Venice in northern Italy. In addition, they performed the duties of the bodyguard, first of the provveditore, and later as the personal guard of the Doge himself.

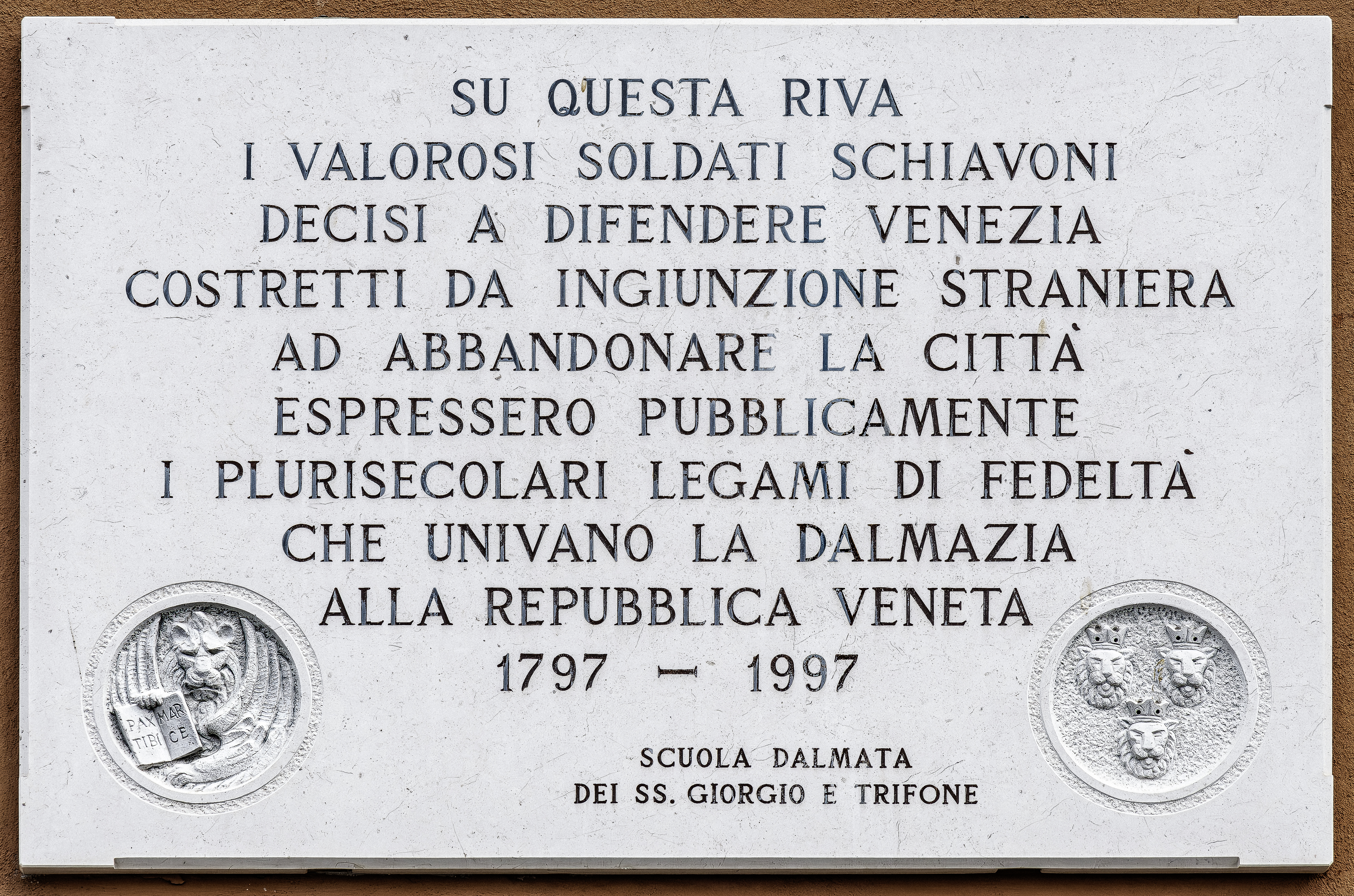
A memorial plaque, dedicated to the Dalmatian Oltramarines and their service, erected on the bicentenary of the fall of Venice. Riva degli Schiavoni

== History ==
The Oltramarini were primarily filled from local people from the Venetian possessions on the eastern Adriatic coast, i.e. the Slavic (as well as Latin) catholic population from Dalmatia, the so-called Schiavoni, and later, to a lesser extent, members of other nations who came to these units were also recruited, i.e. Christian refugees and exiles from Venetian Albania and Greek countries under Venetian administration (Ionian duchy, Negroponte, Morea, Aegean duchy, Candia and Cyprus).

The command was in Zara/Zadar, while in Venice on the Riva degli Schiavoni there was a recruitment center for the new generations, after which the waterfront itself got its name.

In Venice, together with Dalmatian merchants and sailors, in 1451 they founded the Dalmatian Brotherhood or the Brotherhood of St. George and Tripuna (Scuola di San Giorgio degli Schiavoni), which was the primary gathering place of the Dalmatian/Croatian population in Venice, and which is still active today. In 1675, officers of the Oltramarini and Cappelletti (Croatian cavalry regiments) in Zadar founded the brotherhood of St. Jeronimo in Zadar.

They were led by local commanders. Officers were partly trained at military colleges throughout the Venetian Terraferma, and since 1740, officers have been trained at the Military College (Militar Collegio) in Zadar. The command language in the oltramarines was Dalmatian (lingua illirica). The soldiers called each other "brate" (brother in dalmatian/Croatian).

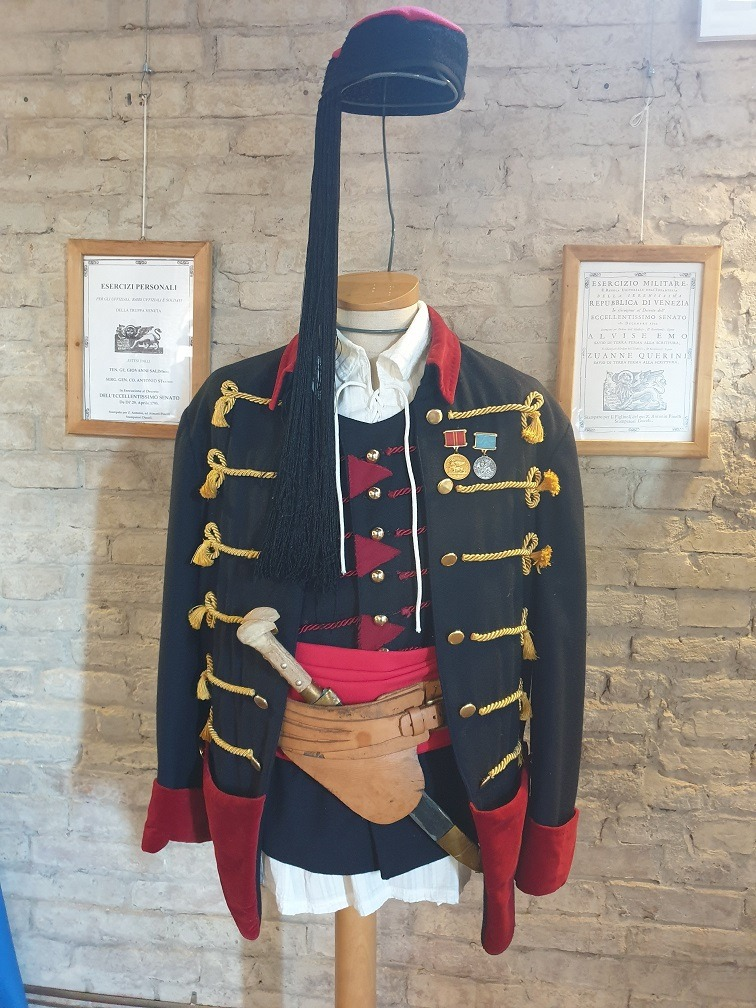
Everyday uniform of the Dalmatian Oltramarini, 18th century, Le Trionfanti Armate Venete, Mestre

== Origins ==
Due to constant Ottoman incursions after the fall of Constantinople in 1453 and the flare-up of the war between the Ottoman Empire and Venice, the Slavic Catholic population of Dalmatia, where the Venetian power with its center in Zadar was consolidated at the beginning of the 15th century, massively joined the units of the Venetian navy, including the naval infantry corps.

The naval infantry of the Venetian navy or Fanti da Mar were organized as far back as 1202 during the Fourth Crusade when they were the key to the conquest of Zadar and later Constantinople. The Slavic population of Dalmatia soon outnumbered members of Latin/Venetian origin, so that at the end of the century, the fanti da mar were exclusively recruited from Dalmatia, and the name schiavoni became a synonym for naval infantry.

It will have its first notable role in the failed defense of Negroponte in 1470 during the First Venetian-Ottoman War, when the entire Venetian crew was killed after a frantic defense. The Bailo of Negroponte, Paolo Erizzo, had under his command, in addition to the Venetian and Greek troops, a contingent of naval infantry from Dalmatia.

=== War of Cyprus ===
Oltramarini will share a tragic fate with the other defenders of Cyprus during the Siege of Famagusta. They joined the battle on January 26, 1571, under the command of Captain Gianantonio Querini and formed a contingent of foot soldiers who broke through the Ottoman blockade on Venetian galleys and arrived in besieged Famagusta. The heroic defense would last until the summer when, after a full 11 months, the defense commander Marco Antonio Bragadin decided to ask for a truce and surrender. The surviving defenders were promised safe passage, but on August 4, the Ottomans broke their promise and massacred the civilians and the remaining five hundred surviving defenders, and brutally tortured and killed Bragadin.

=== Battle of Lepanto ===
The heroic resistance of Famagusta gave the Christian forces enough time, keeping the huge Ottoman fleet occupied, to gather and organize. The Holy League set sail from the port of Messina with a force of 206 galleys and 6 galleass (galeazza). The Republic of Venice participated with 109 galleys and six galleys. Sailors and soldiers from Dalmatia and Istria fill as many as twenty galleys of the Venetian fleet, including the Capitana, the Venetian command ship of Admiral (Capitàn da mar) Sebastian Venier, the supreme commander of all Venetian forces.

After four hours of fierce fighting, the fleet of the Holy League was victorious. The Battle of Lepanto was a heavy defeat for the Ottoman fleet, 25,000 to 30,000 men were died. The Holy League fleet lost about 15 galleys; 7,500 to 10,000 people died and 15,000 were wounded. After that battle, Ottoman naval supremacy in the Mediterranean ended. The losses of Dalmatia and Istria were enormous, of about 9,000 sailors and soldiers, a third did not return.

=== War of Candia ===
During the Candian War, the Oltramarini will fight on three fronts; in the defense of Dalmatia, in the defense of Crete and as naval infantry in naval battles. At the beginning of the war in 1645, oltramarini from Zadar successfully repelled the first Turkish attack on Split, when together with the Split cernide defeated the Turkish army of about 2,000 soldiers. In 1647, contingents of oltramarini took part in the defense of Šibenik under the command of the German condottiere baron Christoph Martin von Degenfeld, they form a professional contingent of 2,500 infantrymen. With about 3,000 cernide from Šibenik, they resisted the attacks of about 25,000 Otoman soldiers. On September 11, after 25 days of fighting, the Provveditore of Dalmatia Leonardo Foscolo sailed into the harbor with reinforcements. After the defense of Šibenik, about 2,000 oltramarini took part in the liberation of the Dalmatian fortresses of Novigrad, Karin, Obrovac and Vrana.

Zuanne Radoš from Trogir especially stood out in these battles as one of the commanders (superintendents) of the oltramarini, who will be awarded the Order of the Knights of St. Mark for his bravery in these battles. In 1648, on the southern battlefield, a large Venetian army under the command of Don Stipan Sorić, consisting of 3,000 oltramarini, 2,000 Swiss, 600 cavalry, 200 dragoons and about 1,000 cernide (under the leadership of Vuk Mandušić) liberated Drniš and Klis.

Venetian victories in Dalmatia will be her only successes of this war. After 22 years of siege, the Republic loses the city of Kandia, the capital and last stronghold on Crete. During the siege, 70,000 Turks, 38,000 Cretan serfs, as well as 29,088 Christian defenders of the city, including sailors and soldiers from Dalmatia and Istria, died from disease and fighting. More than 17,000 men from Dalmatia were recruited during this war.

=== Morean War ===
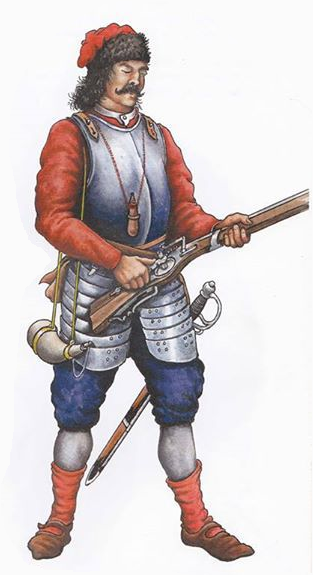
A depiction of a oltramarine from the end of the 16th century

Venice took advantage of the Ottoman defeats at Vienna in the first years of the Great Turkish War, and in 1684, at the persuasion and under the command of Admiral (Capitàn da mar) Francesco Morosini, it set out to conquer Ottoman possessions in Greece.

The first operation of the war for the oltramarini was the successful conquest of the fortress of Preveza, which fell in September after a short siege, and would serve as a great psychological victory for the entire armada due to its reputation as an impregnable fortress.

In December 1684, Dalmatian oltramarini joined the great Venetian army on Corfu with three reinforced regiments.

In the summer of 1685, Admiral Morosini's forces set out to liberate the Peloponnese. The first fortress to fall was the former Venetian castle of Koroni, which was taken by amphibious landing of the Venetian forces on August 11. The city of Kalamata fell on September 14 after the Dalmatian-German forces under Colonel von Degenfeld defeat the strong garrison of the Ottoman general Kapudan Pasha.

In the summer of 1686, Morosini and his fleet attacked Modon, which fell after two weeks of bombardment and a fierce oltramarini infantry attack. Dalmatian troops also distinguished themselves in the lightning-fast conquest of the fortress of Arkadia (today Kiparisija).

In the spring of 1687, the last major Ottoman forts in the Peloponnese, city of Patras and the forts at the entrance to the Gulf of Corinth, Rio and Antirio, fell. The Peloponnese was under complete Venetian control. The news of the great victory was greeted in Venice with great joy and celebration. Morosini was given the title of Peloponnesiacus.

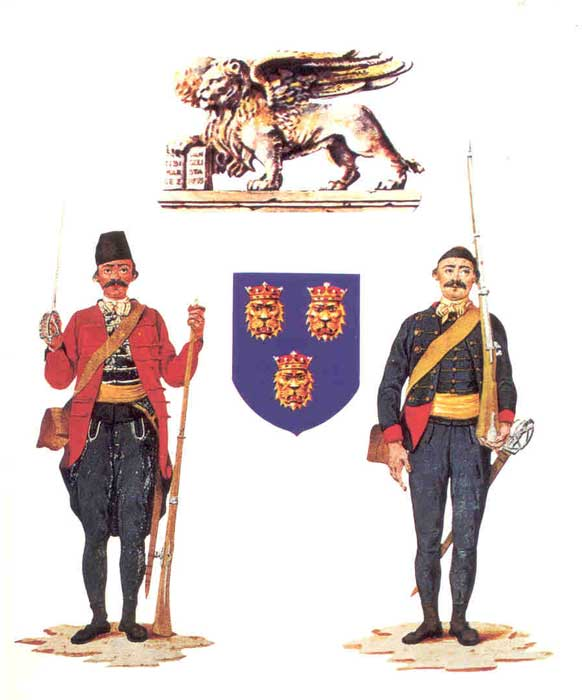
Uniform and weapons of the Dalmatian oltamarini troops, Red coated uniform was designed for service in Terraferma, dark blue was standard service uniform.

War was also fought in Dalmatia, Herzegovina and Boka. As the professional army of Venice in Dalmatia, regiments of oltramarini and their cavalry counterparts croati a cavallo, with the support of the local irregular units; cernide and orthodox morlachs, successfully liberated Sinj and Knin.

=== Second Morean War ===
During the Second Morean War, the oltramarini fought in Dalmatia, and in the defence of Corfu. In Dalmatia in 1715 they participated in heroic defense of Sinj, where 4 companies from the Corponese regiment together with local militia (cernide) and professional Italian units fought off Turkish assaults.

Larger formations participated in final liberation of Dalmatia under provveditore Emo. These victories marked the future border of Dalmatia towards Bosnia (the Dinara mountain).

In 1716. during the defense of Corfu, 2 regiments of oltramarini under the command of colonel Antono Kumbat broke the Turkish blockade and served as relief force for the besieged Venetian – German contingent under command of Prussian general Matthias von der Schulenburg.

On August 19, 800 Dalmatians reinforced by company of elite Venetian grenadiers under personal command of colonel Kumbat charged the Janissary positions on Fort Scarpone. After 6 hours of fighting, the Venetians emerged victorious, 1,200 janissaries lost their lives, as did half of the Venetians. After this loss and the arrival of new Venetian reinforcements, on August 21, the Turks stop their attacks and on August 25, they withdraw from Corfu.

=== Fall of La Serenissima ===
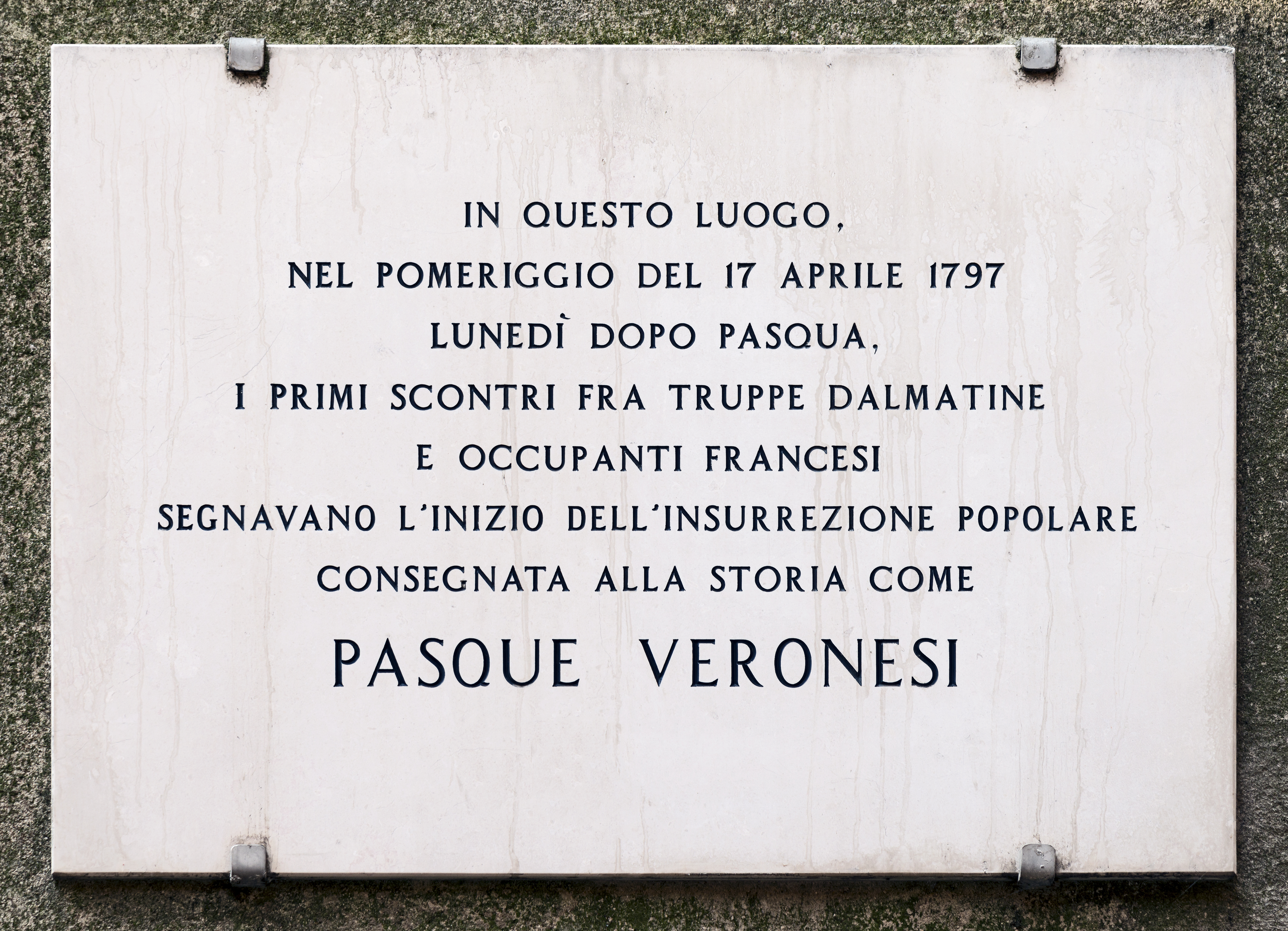
Plaque on the site of Veronese uprising.

In fear of the French occupation, the Venetian government introduced a complete mobilization, all eleven Dalmatian regiments were deployed in Terraferma, with the express order to avoid conflicts with the French at all costs.

The "peaceful" French occupation of the Venetian cities did not go smoothly, and soon anti-Jacobin rebellions began, the most significant of which was in Verona. To calm the situation in the city, the senate sends Medin regiment of the oltramarini, but the exact opposite happens. Citizens join the Dalmatian troops in expelling the French garrison, the event will be remembered as the Veronese Easter – Pasque Veronesi, i.e. as Le Massacre de Verona in French sources. After nine days of fighting, under siege by another 15,000 French soldiers, Verona falls on April 25., French lost more than 500 men. As the last proof of loyalty to the Venetian Republic, thousands of Dalmatian oltramarini and sailors were the last armed force willing to fight to the end for Venice. Oltramarini officers demanded that the city be prepared for a siege and defended. The main supporter of that idea was the Doge's consigliere Francesco Pesaro, who until the last day begged the Doge not to hand over power to the Jacobins and to retreat to Zadar, then a strong center of Venetian Dalmatia, he also counted on the intact fleet anchored in Corfu.

Despite the will of the Venetian and Dalmatian officers to preserve the Republic, fearing the destruction of the city, Doge Manin and most of the nobility did not comply with the wishes of the Dalmatians to fight, and on May 12, 1797, they handed over power to Napoleon, thus the thousand-year-old republic fell.

When 4,000 French soldiers entered the city, the oltramarini refused to hand over their weapons and regimental flags and shouted the centuries-old military cry "viva san marco" with shots in the air as they boarded the ships that were supposed to take them to their homeland. On May 12, 1797, the ultramarine troops left Venice for the last time from the Rive degli Schiavoni.

== Organization ==
The oltramarines were formed in eleven regiments/reggimenti which took the name of their colonel/kolunel (colonnello) who, by order of the provveditore, would collect volunteers for service, and was of their origin, e.g. Reggimento Bubich or Reggimento Medin.

The regiment consisted of a large number of companies/kumpanije (compagnia), seven to nine, but never less than five. Each compagnia numbered an average of fifty to seventy soldiers and officers. Quite often, companies were organized ad hoc as separate units, and not as part of a larger regiment of several companies. During the war, selected banderies of the territorial units of the Cernide or Paesani units would be added to the companies, on the example of the Medin regiment, during Napoleon's invasion of Terraferma, number of soldiers per company increased from about 50 to as many as 120 soldiers, half of whom were Cernide.

In peace, the corps numbered about 6,000 soldiers, and two cavalry regiments, about 600 horsemen (cappelletti) , during the war, the number rose to 9,000 to 10,000 soldiers. In addition to regiments, larger units were also organized, specifically two regiments under the command of a more experienced colonel/colonel were called brigades/brigata, they were used during the Morean War. During the Candian War, the oltramarini corps numbered as many as 17,000 soldiers.

Regimental ranks

- Colonello (Dalm. Kolunel) – Colonel
- Tenente Colonello – Lieutenant Colonel
- Sargente Maggiore – Major
- Aiutante (Dalm. Ađutant) – Sergeant major

Company ranks

- Capitano (Dalm. Kapetan) – Captain
- Tenente Capitano – Captain lieutenant (only in Colonel company)
- Tenente (Dalm. Tenant) – Lieutenant
- Alifere (Dalm. Alfir) – Ensign
- Sargente (Dalm. Saržent) – Sergeant
- Foriere (Dalm. Forir) – Quartermaster sergeant
- Capolare (Dalm. Kapolar) – Corporal

== See also ==
- Cappelletti
- Uskoks
- Venetian Dalmatia
- Cernida
- Stratioti
- Hussar
- Pandurs
- Skirmisher
- Military Frontier
