= Veronese Easter =

1797 rebellion against French forces during the invasion of Venice

Coordinates: 45.4333°N 10.9833°E

Veronese Easters
- Part of the Fall of the Republic of Venice in the Italian campaign of 1796–1797
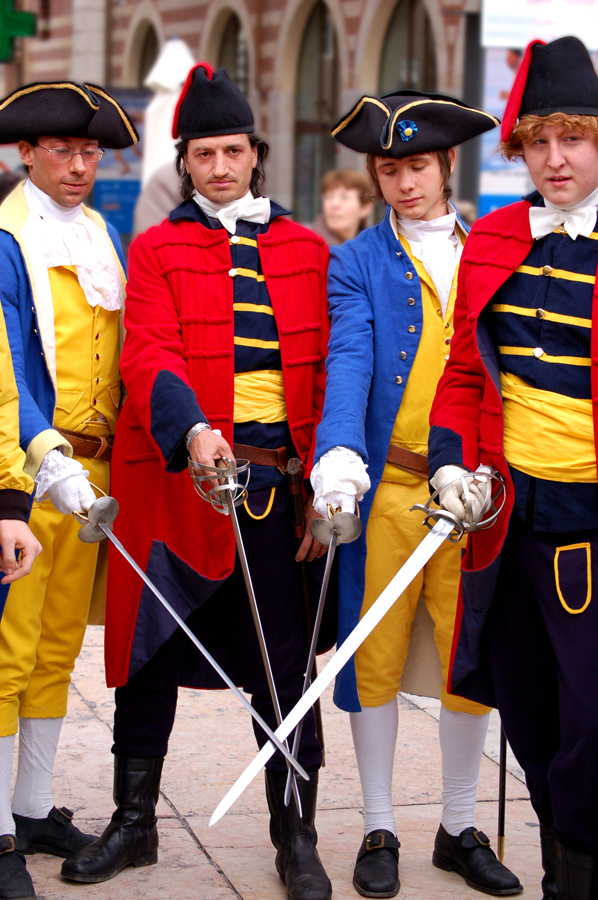
- Verona's Guardia Nobile (in blue and yellow and tricornes) and Schiavoni troops (in red jackets and black fezs,) during a re-enactment of the Pasque Veronesi.
Date	17 April 1797 – 25 April 1797
Location	Verona, Republic of Venice; now in the Italian region of Veneto
Result	French victory: Fall of the Republic of Venice

Belligerents
French Republic	People of Verona; Medin Regiment

Commanders and leaders
Antoine Balland; General Landrieux	Francesco Battaia; Col. Medin

Strength
3,000 regulars 15,000 reinforcements	600 Veronesi; 550 Dalmatians; 2,500 Milita

The Veronese Easter (Italian: Pasque Veronesi, or singular Pasqua Veronese; French: Pâques véronaises) was a rebellion during the Italian campaign of 1797, in which inhabitants of Verona and the surrounding areas revolted against the French occupying forces under Antoine Balland, while Napoleon Bonaparte (the French supreme commander in the Italian campaign) was fighting in Austria. The uprising received its name through association with the anti-French uprising of the Sicilian Vespers of the 13th century. Incited by oppressive behaviour by the French (confiscating the assets of Verona's citizens and plotting to overthrow the city's local government), it began on the morning of 17 April 1797, the second day of Easter: the enraged population succeeded in defeating more than a thousand French soldiers in the first hour of fighting, forcing them to take refuge in the town's fortifications, which the mob then captured by force. The revolt ended on 25 April 1797 with the encirclement and capture of the town by 15,000 soldiers, who then forced it to pay a huge fine and hand over various assets, including artwork.

== Context ==
The Pasque Veronesi was the most important episode in a vast anti-French and anti-Jacobin insurgency movement which arose throughout the Italian peninsula from 1796 to 1814 – other important episodes included the campaigns of the Armata della Santa Fede which, guided by Cardinal Ruffo, succeeded in reconquering the Kingdom of Naples, the actions of the Viva Maria band in Tuscany and Liguria, and Andreas Hofer's victories in the County of Tyrol. The movement's followers were numerous, with sources talking of at least 280,000 insurgents and 70,000 dead.

These revolts were primarily against French domination Jacobin-inspired French political ideology, opposed as such ideology was to prevailing opinions fundamental to Italian society in that period.

== Prelude ==
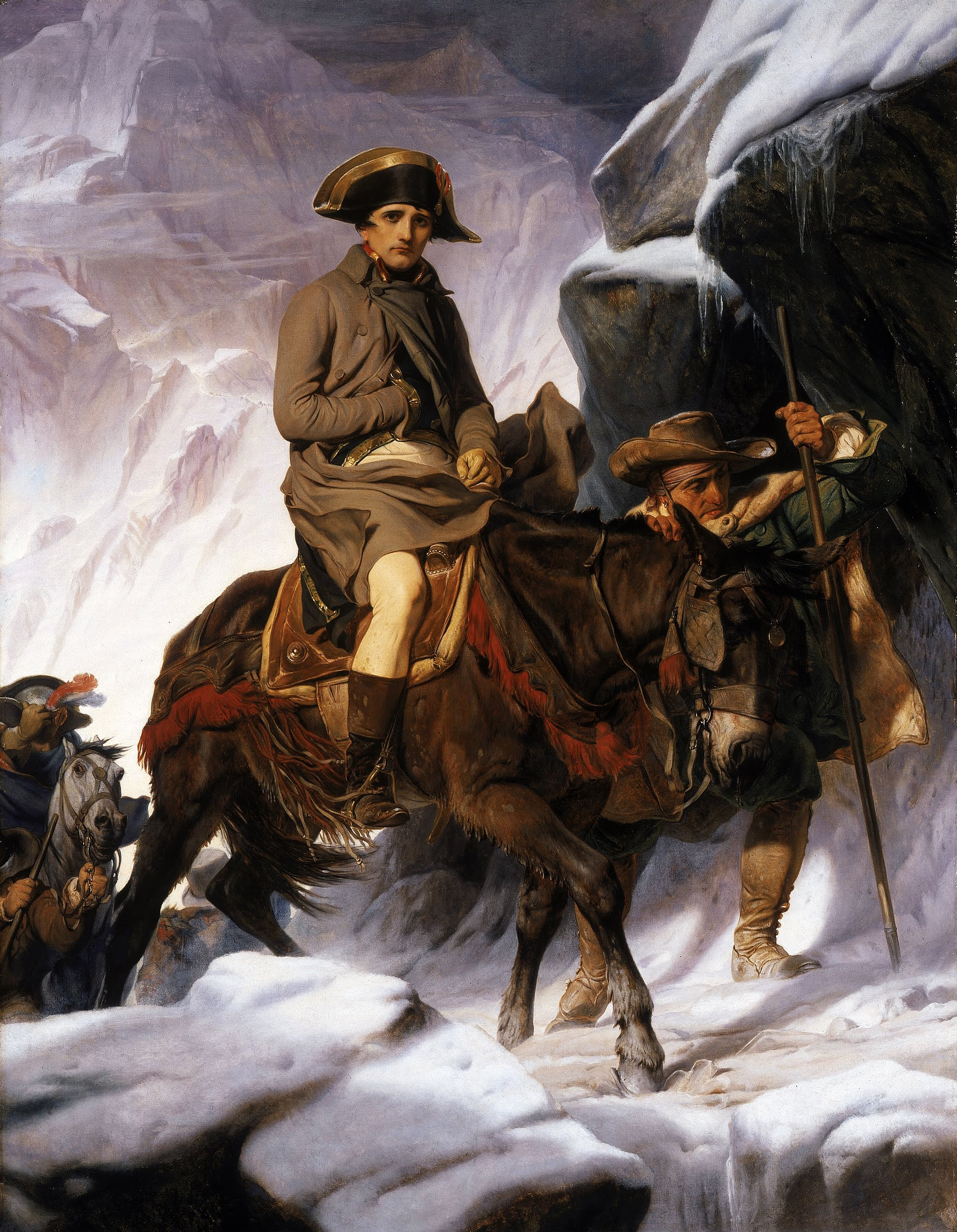
Paul Delaroche, Napoleon crossing the Alps

Napoleon's objective, even as early as spring 1796, was the conquest of rich Venetian Lombardy, and in effect French troops, initially welcomed on the assumption that their stay would be brief, had reached Brescia and Verona by the end of the year : these cities were technically under Venetian domination, and thus the foundations were laid for the events of the following year. The French troops arrived in Verona on 1 June 1796, occupying the military strong-points and billeting troops in other buildings despite the Republic of Venice already having declared its neutrality.

The relations between the population and the Venetian departments on one side, and the French troops on the other, was difficult from the start, for the French troops behaved more as occupiers than guests. Bergamo, in contrast, resisted the French invasion.

=== Democratization of Bergamo ===
Alessandro Ottolini, podestà of Bergamo and a patriot who had raised 10,000 men for the defence of the Bergamasca Nation, at the end of December had to accept General Louis Baraguey d'Hilliers's request to billet French troops inside the city, since without soldiers they could not have resisted the French force and since (due to Venetian neutrality) the city could not consent to an attack. The French general, however, did not lower the flags of San Marco, given that this city too was officially under Venetian control.

The next phase of Napoleon's plan assumed that the region's democratisation would lead to the administration passing into the hands of the Jacobin Lombards, who would then create a republic (comprising the territories as far as Verona, or even Padova) allied to France. When secret information of this reached Ottolini, he immediately informed Venice's provveditore. Francesco Battaia, hesitating to follow up his actions with force, replied that Ottolini should double-check if this information was true. Thanks to a spy, Ottolini quickly confirmed Napoleon's intentions, but still Battaia did nothing.

The work of democratising Bergamao was initiated by François Joseph Lefebvre, the successor to Baraguay d'Hilliers, but there were too few Jacobin locals. Napoleon reminded the general that the democratisation should appear to be the will of the people – the general, therefore, whilst keeping Ottolini otherwise occupied, summoned representatives of the citizen-body to secede from Venice's rule. These representatives protested but were obliged to assent. Ottolini had in the meantime recalled some military companies from the provinces, and the French used this action as a pretext for occupying the city. Bergamo thus officially became the first city in the Veneto removed from Venice's rule, and Ottolini was forced to give up the city. In the meantime, Napoleon set off to march on Vienna via the defiles of Carinthia, ultimately ending up in Leoben negotiating a treaty with Austria.

=== Democratization of Brescia ===
The next step would have to be the democratisation of Brescia. In this case, despite the town already being partially under French control, the democratisation would have to be conducted (or at least appear to be conducted) by the local Jacobins, given that at Bergamo French involvement in the process had been too obvious. On 16 March, a column of soldiers (partly French, partly local Jacobins) left for Brescia. Its podestà, Giovanni Alvise Mocenigo, wished to attack this hostile column but was stopped from doing so by Battaia, who was still worried about the eventual use of force.

Two days later 200 men entered Brescia and, with the aid of Brescian Jacobins, put down what little resistance was offered. Their first act after gaining the city was to hunt down Battaia, who had fled to Verona. Although lacking the support of the population, with French help the Jacobins succeeded in democratising the countryside and (on 28 March) the town of Crema.

=== The Veronese revolts and campaign ===
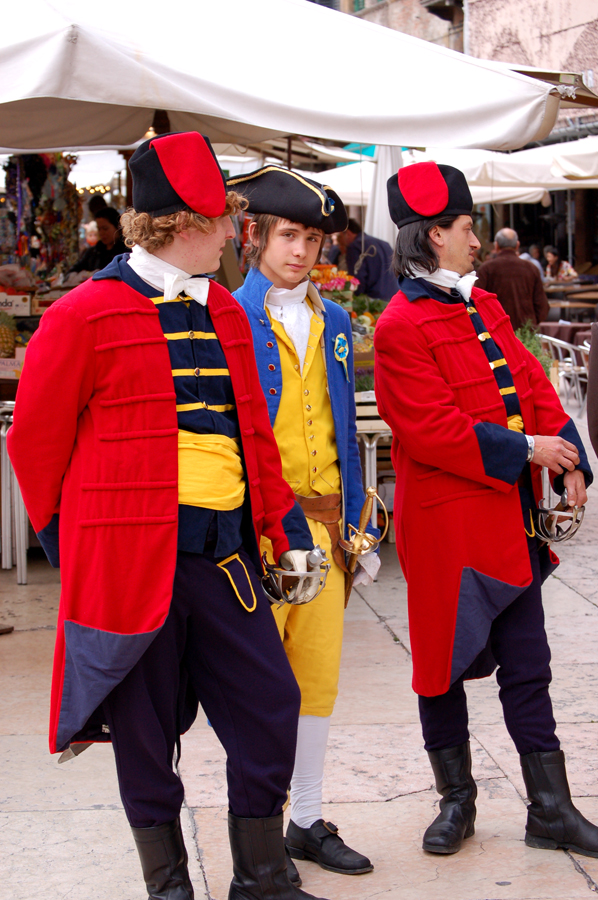
Re-enactors of Venetian troops in the piazza delle Erbe

The provveditore Battaia arrived at Verona on 22 March, and immediately called a meeting of the council, which included several other military leaders (the conte Pompei, Ernesto Bevilacqua, Antonio Maffei, Marcantonio Miniscalchi, Ignazio Giusti, Francesco Emilei and Alessandro Ottolini). During the council, Maffei, Ottolini and Emilei tried to convince the other members of the importance of reconquering the territory they had lost and that at that moment this was the most important thing for the defence of the Veronese nation, against the Jacobin members' objections. Battaia urged caution, but conte Emilei noted that passive resistance had already lost them Brescia, and that Verona's citizens were ready to take up arms against the Jacobin Lombards. Battaia, realising that many of those present were of Emilei's opinion, changed his mind and so it was unanimously decided to provide for the defence of Verona's borders, nominally against the local Jacobins but in effect also to prevent Napoleon's own force returning into Italy.

Action was immediately taken: Miniscalchi was put in command of the long defence-line at Garda, and Bevilacqua of the line between Villafranca di Verona and the border with Ferrara, with Maffei positioned between these two lines.

Meanwhile, conte Augusto Verità had returned to Verona. Always enjoying good relations with the French, he proposed to get an assurance of French neutrality before the Veronese forces clashed with the Jacobins. Writing to the commander of the French troops at Verona, general Antoine Balland, he stated:

La Nazione Veronese, in data 20 marzo 1797, per bocca dei legittimi rappresentanti i corpi della stessa, rappresenta al Cittadino Comandante le truppe francesi in questa che attrovandosi pienamente felice sotto il paterno ed amoroso Veneto Governo, non può che raccomandarsi alla magnanimità della Nazione Francese, onde nelle attuali circostanze sia preservata nella sua presente costituzione, dal quale sincero e costante sentimento ritirar giammai non la potrà che la forza.

The substance of the letter was a request for authorisation to defend Verona's boundaries against aggressors, which the French general was forced to consent to, since if he did not the only way they could officialice their arrival would be through Venice's authority over her territories. Bonaparte agreed with Balland's decision, and informed the Venetian senate that French troops would not intervene and that he was hurt by how much success they had had at Bergamo and Brescia. Balland's response to the letter aroused Verona's inhabitants to great enthusiasm for defending their own territory.

Initially the military leaders were instructed to defend Verona's borders with practically no men, although the cernide was able to offer 6,000 men, and many volunteers arrived, especially from Valpolicella.

On 23 March news reached Verona that 500 Jacobin soldiers headed for Peschiera del Garda or Valeggio sul Mincio had set out from Brescia – the officials and troops rushed to take up their positions. Miniscalchi went to Colà, a small village above the hills of Lazise, Giusti to Povegliano Veronese, Bevilacqua to Cerea, and Maffei to Valeggio. From Valeggio Maffei could see that the enemy troops were still not in sight, and was thus had time to put his own troops in better order. 24 fanti coming from Brescia also joined his force, as well as 40 Croatian cavalrymen and 2 cannons coming from Verona. On 27 March he decided to send off a scouting party, whilst at Castelnuovo del Garda 1,500 volunteers gathered.

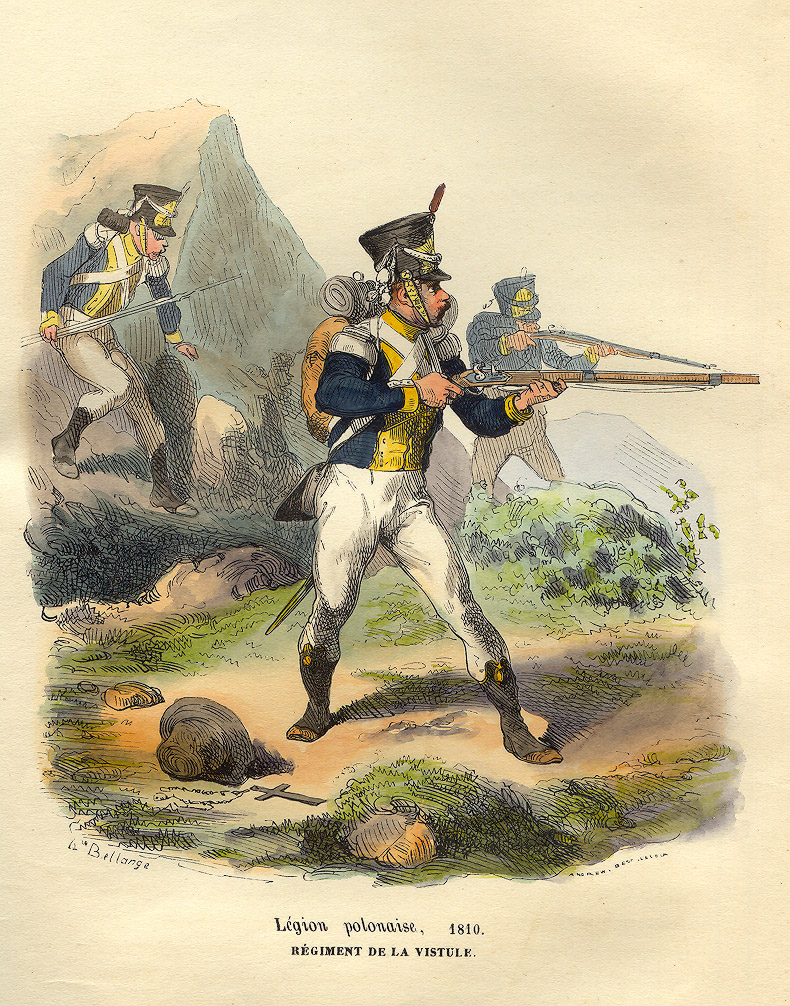
Uniform and weapons of the Polish troops in French service, who met the insurgents on 29 March at Villanuova, near Salò

News of the Veronese troop movements arrived at the Bermagascene valleys, where several anti-French revolts

were breaking out. On 29 March the whole Bergamasque mountainous zone rose in revolt, in such great numbers that its leaders decided to march on Bergamo. Around the same time the population of Salò rose up, urged to resistance by Battaia, who assured them by letter that he would send them munitions and 80 dragoons. The letter roused the population's enthusiasm, and they succeeded in raising the Leone di San Marco flag and forcing the Jacobins to flee the city. A short time later the inhabitants of Maderno, Toscolano and Teglie also rose up. 1,000 men – Lombard Jacobins, Polish soldiers and French soldiers – that had gathered at Brescia were invited to Salò. These men met the insurgents at Villanuova, not far from the little town of Garda, but they lacked ammunition and had to quickly retreat into Salò itself. A second encounter saw a victory by the inhabitants of Salò, thanks to an attack on the three sides of the mountain range of the val Sabbia: among the enemy troops, 66 were killed and several taken prisoner, including several Jacobin leaders.

Battaia, as he had promised, sent off 80 dragoons on 30 March. In the meantime Calcinato and Bedizzole hunted down local Jacobins, clearing the road to Salò for the dragoons, who thus reached Salò after capturing several fleeing Jacobins.

In the meantime a Veronese attack on Desenzano failed: news of the uprising in the Bergamasque and Brescian valleys, at Lonato and Salò encouraged the territories of the Venetian Republic, but on the same day came news that the French were attacked the insurgents who had surrounded Bergamo, and the following day that two battles had occurred – one had been won by the French, and the other by the insurgents, with the insurgents nevertheless having to retreat into the mountains and surrender, thus demonstrating the French army had the upper hand.

Maffei had decided to march on Brescia, but was convinced out of it by Battaia, for (according to Battaia) France could use such an action as a pretext for declaring war on Venice. With the support of Iseppo Giovannelli e Alvise Contarini (the Venetian government representatives in the city), Maffei had a clear road down which to advance but had orders to stop 10 miles short of Brescia – the troops would march to the top of the Mincio but not advance on the city, with themselves and the insurgents blockading it on 3 sides.

General Charles Edward Kilmaine (Irish in origin, but then serving in the French army) gathered 7,000 men at Milan and left for Brescia, along the way attacking the rebelling villages and forcing them to fund his expedition. Meanwhile, at Brescia general Landrieux threatened Maffei with a bombardment of Verona if he did not leave the field and so, after two short clashes between French and Venetian troops on 8 and 9 April, Maffei decided to retreat towards Verona.

== The final days before the revolt ==
Napoleon (then marching towards Austria) was convinced that the last forces of the Venetian Republic had concentrated in the stronghold at Verona. In effect, although the recent events showed that Venice had taken the initiative taken back from the French, Venice continued to proclaim its neutrality. Bonaparte sent a spy to Verona, Angelo Pico, who rendezvoused with about 300 Jacobins there, to put a conspiracy into effect. This, however, was uncovered by the secret police, and on 11 April some patrols (uniquely taking action in broad daylight) arrested them in the street and at home, even if Pico and other leaders of the plot succeeded in evading capture by taking refuge in Verona's fortifications (then in French hands). Giovanelli went to protest deeply, but was not even given a reply, and the French commander Balland supplied ammunition and ordered the town's castelli to be fortified. Contarini, worried, sent off an urgent letter to the Senate and to the Doge.

In the meantime came news of the French's suppression of the rebellions at Lonato and Salò.

Contarini and Giovanelli on 6 April sent Nogarola to the defence of Verona's eastern borders, near Isola della Scala, to protect them from attack from behind. On 15 April the stronghold of Peschiera del Garda, in Veronese territory, formally became a French possession. In the meanwhile 400 Poles marched towards Legnago, the French artillery moved to lake Garda, enemy movements were sighted near Cerea where Bevilacqua was positioned, and on the road for Vicenza was posted Giambattista Allegri.

French troops were welcomed into Castelnuovo, since neutrality was still technically in force. When, however, some Venetian troops went into church, leaving their weapons outside, the French requisitioned these weapons, thus once again breaching the neutrality. It was then that Maffei received the order to leave the Mincio, given the considerable risk of being picked off from behind.

After ten months of French occupation the situation had now also reached a critical point within the town: the French soldiers often confiscated the citizens' assets and plotted with the local Jacobins to replace the local government.

== Chronology of the revolt ==
=== 17 April ===
During the night between 16 and 17 April 1797, a manifesto was pinned up in the town's streets, apparently signed by Francesco Battaia and inciting Verona to rebel against the French and local collaborators with them. The manifesto was actually the work of Salvadori, on Landrieux's instructions, in order to supply a pretext for the French to definitively occupy the town.

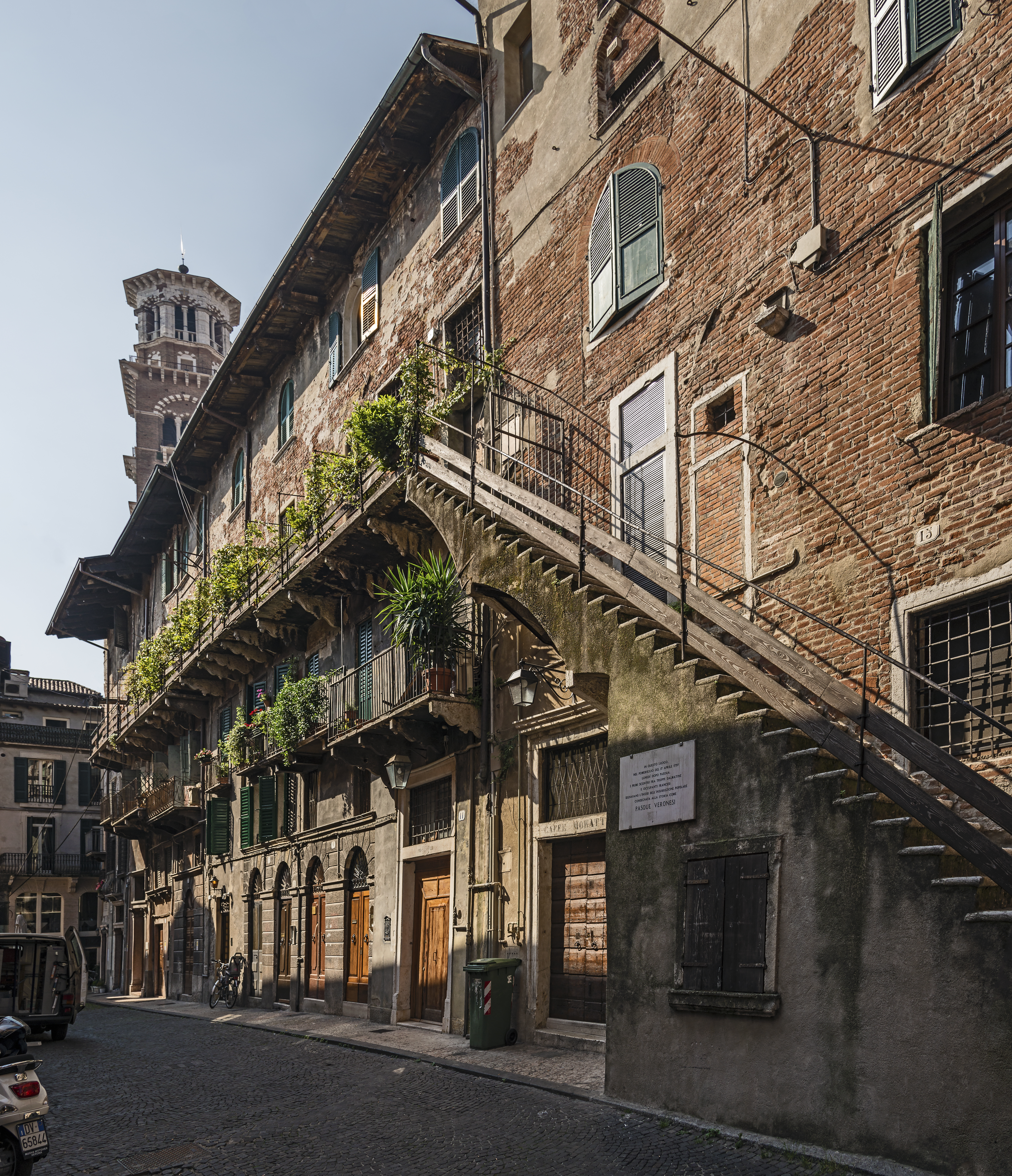
Site of the start of the Pasque Veronesi.

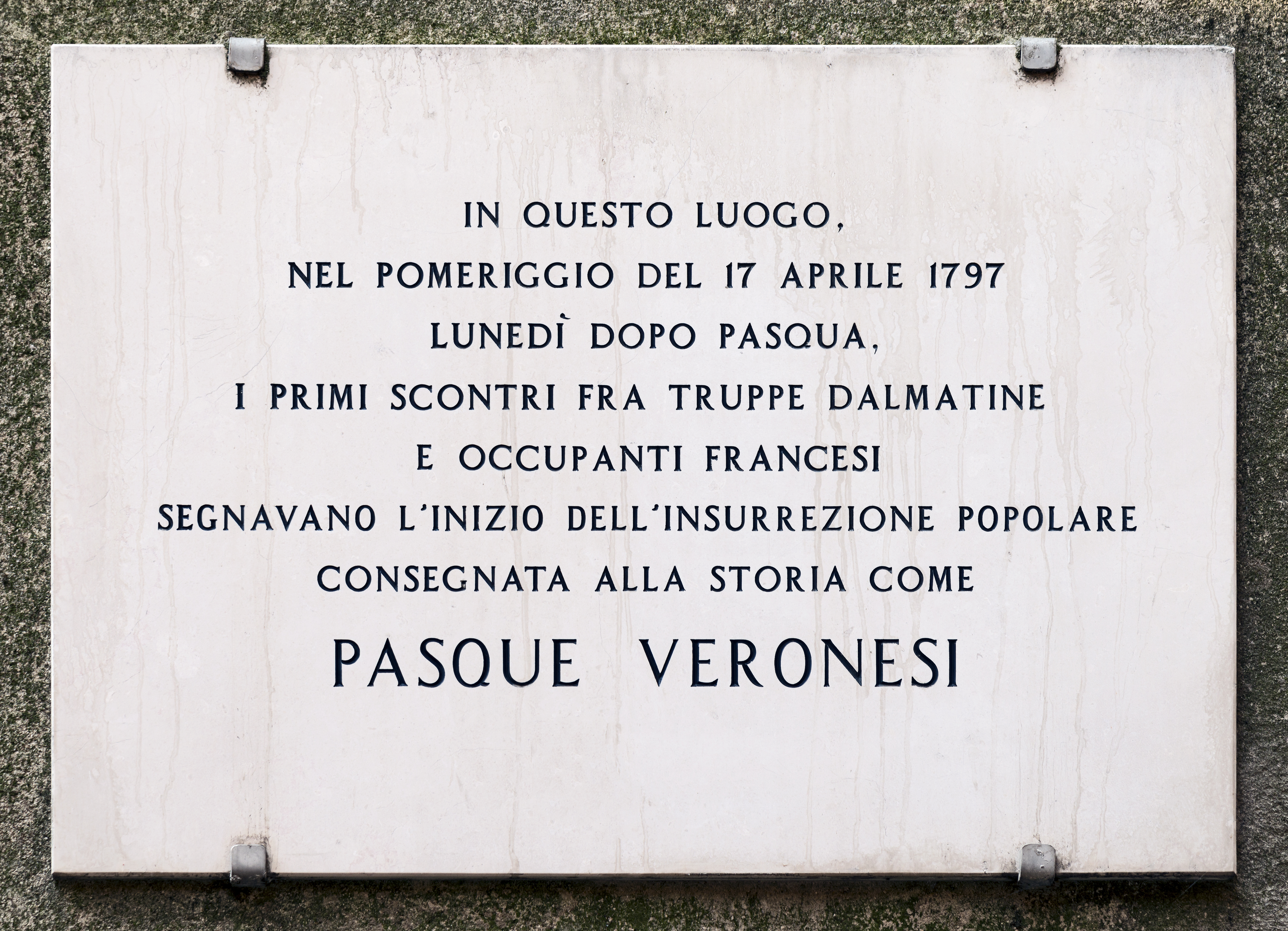
Plaque on the site.

The forgery could easily have been unmasked – the manifesto had already been published in March in some newspapers, like the Termometro Politico and the Monitore Bolognese, and Battaia was at that time in Venice not Verona. The Venetian representatives had all copies taken down, and replaced them with a new manifesto denying the former one and urging the population to remain calm, but now the revolt had already been primed, and in the afternoon diverse brawls were already breaking out.

The French soldiers for their part tried to provoke the crowd, around 2 pm arresting a Venetian artilleryman, while at the same time a brawl broke out in a tavern in via Cappello between a Frenchman and a Croatian. The Frenchman came off worse and fled back to his own patrol, which protested loudly. It was then that the people took up arms en masse, and in the turmoil between the people and the soldiers came a rifle shot left which put the French to flight. Shortly after another brawl exploded in a tavern on Piazza delle Erbe, while some people who had previously been kept in check by officers of the Venetian army attacked the guards to the bridges Ponte Pietra and Ponte Nuovo. The French commanders then directed troops into the town, and stationed 600 men in piazza Bra to monitor the situation.

The townspeople were calming down when, around 5 pm, on the orders of general Balland, the cannons of castel San Felice (the French headquarters) and Castel San Pietro opened fire, and numerous shots landed in piazza dei Signori. This French action was caused by the commanders' safety and ability to monitor the revolt easily, feeling it would be a useful pretext to occupy the town officially. Verona's citizens were at that moment entering the church, and were overcome with anger.

The first episode of the uprising occurred in Piazza d'Armi, where 600 French soldiers were stationed near the hospital (today the site of palazzo Barbieri), whilst Venetian soldiers found themselves near the Liston (around 500) and under the Gran Guardia. Hearing the first shots of the French cannon, the French troops took up arms and set off quickly towards Castelvecchio, whilst the Venetian troops were dismayed, not knowing what they were allowed to do after their commanders' had reminded them for months of the importance of Venetian neutrality. Meanwhile, the Veronese began firing from neighbouring palaces, injuring some soldiers.

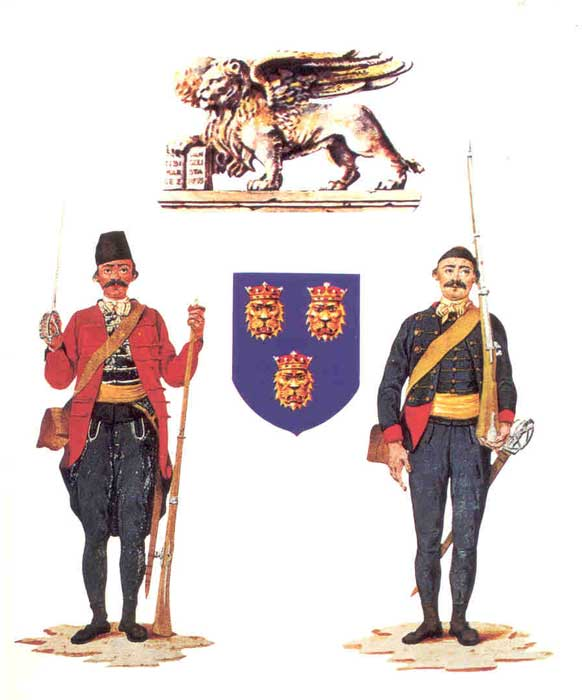
Uniform and weapons of the Dalmatian oltamarini troops in Venetian service, regiment of whom retook Verona from the French.

The townspeople raged against the French troops who had vanished throughout the town and from their guard-points of the bridges. Numerous soldiers had been killed or captured, while those messengers who were fleeing went to hide in their companions' lodgings and the entrances were barricaded, but the townspeople got into these lodgings and even onto their roofs, even as the bombardment of the town from the surrounding strong points and from castel Vecchio continued.

At this moment Francesco Emilei was encamped near Lugagnano, a few kilometres from Verona, and on hearing of the revolt rapidly marched back to Verona with his troops. On the morning of the 17th the French had doubled their guards on the town gates, but Porta Vescovo was easily captured by Coldogno and (with a little more effort) Nogarola managed to take porta San Giorgio. Emilei took porta San Zeno from outside the city and was able to enter with 2,500 volunteers of the cernide, 600 other troops and 2 cannon, which he divided into 4 corps, posted in different locations in and outside the town: one corps was put outside porta Nuova to block the French escape, and another near bastione dei Riformati.

Armed with rifles, pistols, sabres, pitchforks and staffs, the townsfolk rushed through the streets, killing, wounding and capturing several Frenchmen. One of the rebellion's first acts was to release several Austrian troops from their prisons to join with the rebels.

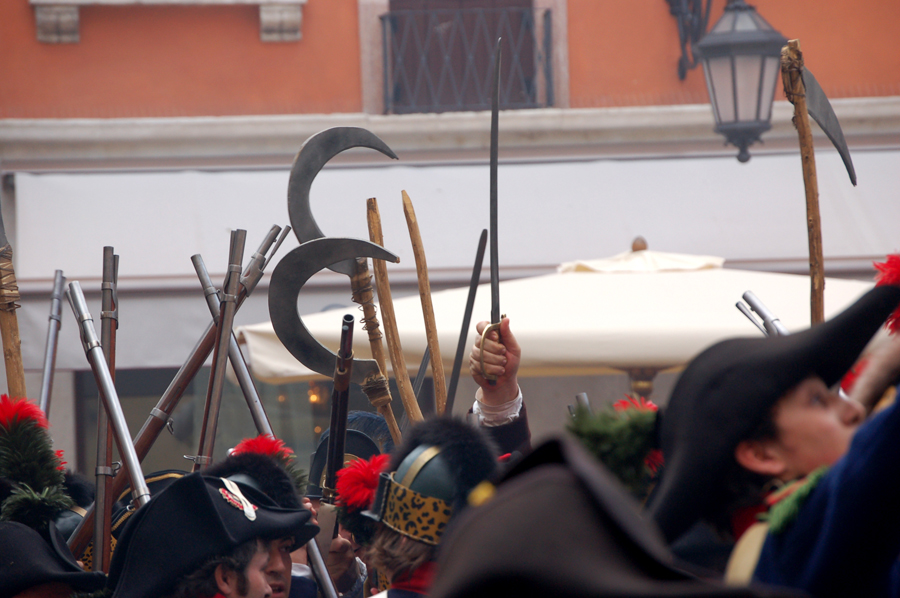
The Veronese people were the main mover in the Pasque Veronesi, carrying out attacks on their own initiative, sometimes supported by Venetic troops

In the late afternoon Emilei, who had just taken porta Nuova, decided to leave for Veneice to seek help from the Venetian army. In contrast Iseppo Giovannelli and Alvise Contarini, the Venetian government representatives in the town, thought they could even now turn Verona back to its former Venetian neutrality, and so tried to make a compromise with the French military authorities, interrupting the sound of bells and hoisting a white flag atop torre dei Lamberti. Balland paused the bombardment (even if battle continued around Castel Vecchio, it having been isolated from the castelli on the hills and was thus unable to gain information on the course of events). Negotiations thus began, which Balland wanted to prolong to give more time for French reinforcements to arrive.

The negotiations failed and the Venetian governors then sought in vain to calm down the populace. Fearful of how the situation would develop, in the meeting between 17 and 18 April the governors decided to withdraw to Vicenza, and before their departure ordered the troops not to participate in the battle. Hence, on 18 April, Giovannelli and Contarini, according to the plan they had put forward in the meeting, would be directed to Venice, to ask the Senate for help. The order was carried out, at first, by Nogarola, Berettini and Allegri, while Antonio Maria Perez continued military operations. In the meantime the population continued to raid any buildings holding (or believed to hold) French soldiers, systematically killing them, while the streets of the town heard nothing but a continuous scream in every corner of the town of "Viva San Marco!".

=== 18 April ===
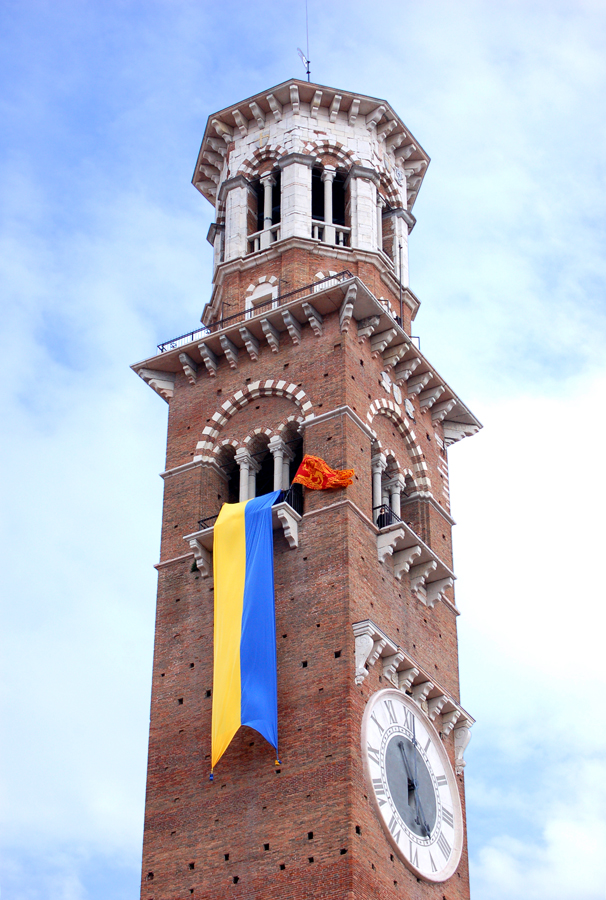
The torre dei Lamberti, whose bells (known as "il Marengo") rang out the progress of the revolt, and suffered many hits from the French cannon.

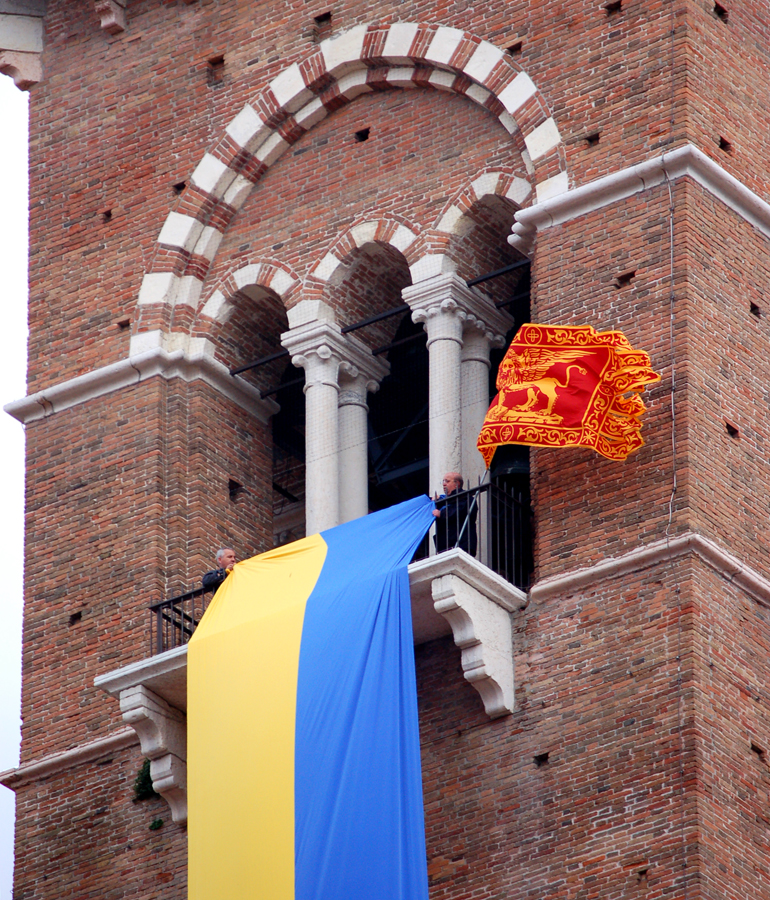
Detail, showing the flag of the Venetian Republic and the blue and yellow flag of Verona, hoisted in memory of the start of the Pasque Veronesi

On the 18th, with the governors already set out for Vicenza, Emilei made preparations to get to Venice to contact the Senate, while in Verona Maffei and other military leaders sought to organise the army and the populace, since provveditore Bartolomeo Giuliari alone was unable to bear the gravity of the situation. The French cannon in castello di San Felice and castello di San Pietro opened fire again almost as soon as the truce expired, and quick French sorties (sent out from them with the aim of taking the pressure off Castel Vecchio) were quickly repulsed.

The news of the flight by the two provveditori irritated the populace, who continued to fight in an uncoordinated manner, whilst several peasants and mountain-dwellers arrived from Contado, some of whom were armed. Giuliari ordered the commanders to give weapons to those from Contado who had none, and produce a constitution for a provisional regency, which then put itself in contact with general Balland, stipulating a three-hour truce elsewhere even if the battle around Castel Vecchio continued. Meanwhile, some citizens succeeded in carrying artillery pieces up onto the colle San Leonardo, higher than both the surrounding hills (colle San Pietro and the Torricelle), and were thus easily able to fire down on the strong points on these hills. Some soldiers were shortly afterwards detached to support the townsfolk on the hill, and to defend the hills themselves.

The principal objective became the capture of Castel Vecchio, to which end the people transported two artillery pieces from bastione di Spagna to porta Borsari and the roof of the teatro Filarmonico, on which wooden scaffolds were installed. Shortly afterwards the people were replaced there by Austrian soldiers, clearly more expert in this field. In the meantime other mortars taken from the enemy were used to besiege the castello, while from Bassano del Grappa conte Augusto Verità arrived at the head of 200 Austrian prisoners. The French trapped in castel Vecchio carried a cannon up to the top of the clock tower and began to bombard porta Borsari, but Augusto Verità responded by bombarding the clock tower with Austrian artillery, succeeding in hitting it, knocking off the cannon and forcing the French to evacuate it. Some of the French on the castle walls were also hit by cannon fire. Shortly before a new assault on the castle a band of French soldiers came out with a white flag as if under truce. Captain Rubbi advanced towards them to negotiate, but the French party then unmasked a cannon and began to fire it, killing Rubbi's soldiers and 30 Veronese. This unleashed all hell around the castello, whilst the timings of the revolt were rung out from torre dei Lamberti, which the French unsuccessfully tried to demolish with cannon fire.

Many peasant volunteers began arriving from the countryside, armed with pitchforks, bastoni and small-arms. Of their resolution, Alberghini writes that "it appeared on the faces of all the desire to die for the Fatherland and of themselves to risk all. The peasants of Vallagarina succeeded in attacking and capturing the church next to Rivoli Veronese, while the mountain-dwellers of Lessinia attacked forte San Felice and castel San Pietro from the north. In the meantime conte Miniscalchi controlled the lake Garda defence-line, Bevilacqua the line at Legnago, and Allegri the San Bonifacio line: Verona's borders were thus all guarded and – for the moment – calm.

The Austrian colonel Adam Adalbert von Neipperg arrived in the city with a band of soldiers, and informed Balland of the treaty of Leoben Bonaparte had negotiated between the French Republic and the Austrian Empire, while the population rejoiced, thinking he was bringing aid to Verona: thus the rebels lost their precious support from Austrian troops. Between intermittent truces, Verona was systematically bombarded from the strongholds and its population continued to fight around the strongholds and attempt to capture them.

=== 19 April ===
On 19 April Bevilacqua was defeated by French troops at Legnago, whilst Miniscalchi was blockaded at Bardolino, leaving only Maffei outside Verona, at Valeggio, who decided to withdraw to Sommacampagna with his 900 infantry and 250 cavalry, so as not to be cut off by the French advance guard: arriving at Sommacampagna left his command to Ferro and returned to Verona in search of orders. The same day Emilei arrived back from Venice, without the help they had hoped for, while at Vicenza the two representatives were persuaded by Erizzo to return and resume negotiations with Balland: the general replied that he and his men would have left the town if the population had been disarmed but that, after the episode at Castel Vecchio, he could believe no one, not even the two representatives.

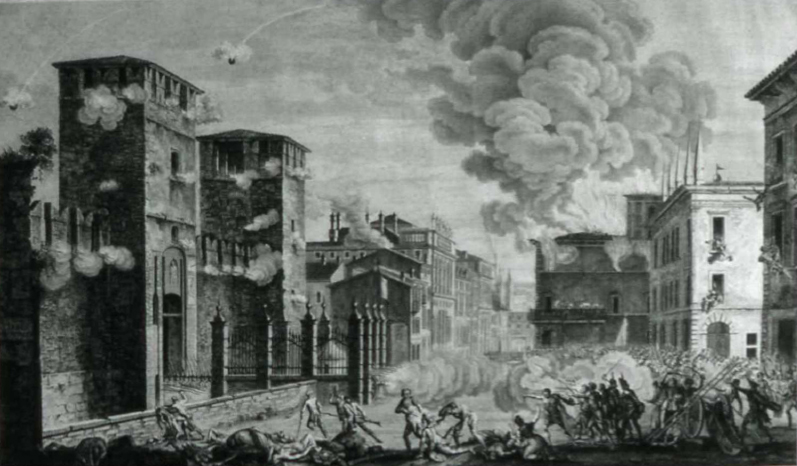
Assault on Castelvecchio, early 19th c.

After this useless attempt at mediation, Contarini and Giovannelli organized the people, who shouted "we want war" and were prepared to defend the town to the bitter end, as shown by a proclamation in which they affirmed that "through removing confusion and disorder, fatal to the good of all, the faithful people of Verona remain committed to withdraw into their respective Contrade [districts]. There they will assign leaders, obedient to you, and be united in one body and the same leaders will obey the cariche's orders and always give themselves towards the common good".

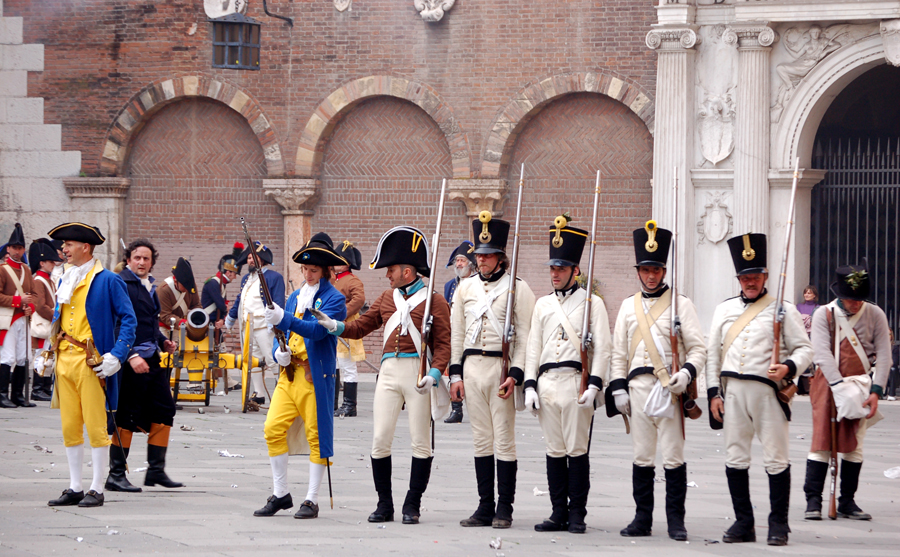
Re-enactors of the Austrian troops who were freed from the French prison by the rioters and subsequently took part in the revolt. The Venetic artillerymen are in red and white, and those of the Guardia Nobile Veronese in blue and yellow.

Battle thus continued, in particular at Castel Vecchio, where the cannon had been given over to the inexpert hands of the Veronese citizens and so were not doing any more major damage. Meanwhile, from the colle San Leonardo, the bombardment of the strongholds continued, and the strongholds had turned to bombarding the city, causing several fires and adding to the damage already caused by the French raids: in one short sortie they had started fires in the surrounding palaces of the town's noble families, destroying several works of art. During another sortie, from Castel Vecchio, the French succeeded in setting light to palazzo Liorsi and palazzo Perez, though on their return all but five of the French soldiers were killed by the rioters.

Near the lazzaretto di Sanmicheli, occupied by a French hospital, a column of armed peasants headed towards the city heard a few rifle shots coming from inside the hospital - enraged, the peasants beat down its doors and massacred the six French soldiers they found inside.

In the afternoon Neipperg and his soldiers left Verona, given that the truce between France and Austria was only due to last a week. In compensation he warned the population that if they resisted him while the truce was still in force he would return to help them. Meanwhile, a French scouting party approached porta San Zeno, which withdrew immediately when fired on by cannon mounted on the city walls. In the same instant, however, they met the column of soldiers under Maffei which was guarding the Chievo line at Santa Lucia. In this line were positioned around 6,000 men under Chabran, while the men under Victor and Miollis were still marching for Verona.

=== 22 and 23 April ===
On the morning of April 22, the French brought firearms to the entrance to San Zeno with the intention of forcing entry, but were stopped by gunfire from citizens stationed intermittently along the walls of the city, forcing the French once again to retreat. Meanwhile, the Frenchmen inside the Castel Vecchio were put in a grave situation; many of the soldiers escaped via the scaligero bridge. There was also an attempt to reconquer the Hill of Saint Leonardo [il colle San Leonardo]. The gunpowder and ammunition for their weapons were becoming scarce, and their rations insufficient for the population because the city had filled up with volunteers and soldiers. The senate sent a letter in which they instructed the city to yield, as had been decided by authorities meeting in Verona. During the meeting, they concluded that the city could not be successfully reinforced, and that preparations for surrender should begin: the heads of the military took to the streets and instructed that combat should be stopped: Many Venetian officials and those of influence in the Venetian Office went throughout every district in Verona proclaiming a truce and exhorted all of the inhabitants to desist from acts of hostility. They united the best of the citizens to their side to calm the populace. Their advice was not given in vain and the multitudes were persuaded by the voices of reason and necessity: you pay if you don't abandon your defensive posts, keep yourselves calm, and no longer put forth cannon fire or gunshots. This was how the battle ended, the most part of which had entered the walls at the twenty-first hour Italian the morning of April 17 lasted without interruption until near the twenty-first hour of the morning of the 23rd. From clamour of battle and activity there came a deep silence, a {nesto} repose, an {ferale} immobility.

The Veronese managed to counter the incursions of the French patrols and endure the bombardment of the city, but could not resist the siege of 15,000 soldiers. Therefore, on April 23 they decided to surrender and sent Balland a message that called a truce of 24 hours. The commander granted a respite until noon the following day.

Of the three thousand French soldiers garrisoned, five hundred were left dead, and approximately one thousand wounded; five hundred soldiers and nineteen hundred members of their families had been captured.

== See also ==
- Devotion of Verona to Venezia
- Domini di Terraferma

== Sources ==
- "Pâques véronaises", in Charles Mullié, Biographie des célébrités militaires des armées de terre et de mer de 1789 à 1850, 1852
- 211° Anniversario delle Pasquale Verona
- E. Bevilacqua. Le Pasque Veronesi. Verona, Remigio Cabianca Libraio, 1897.
- G. Bacigalupo. Le Pasque Veronesi: sonetti. Bologna, Libr. Beltrami, 1914.
- E. Fancelli. L'ussero di Napoleone o le pasque veronesi. Firenze, G. Nerbini, 1931.
- R. Fasanari. Le Pasque veronesi in una relazione inedita. Verona, Linotipia Veronese, 1951.
- A. Zorzi. La Repubblica del Leone. Storia di Venezia. Milano, Rusconi, 1979.
- R. M. Frigo. Le Pasque veronesi nella relazione, inedita, di un generale napoleonico. Verona, Fiorini, 1980.
- I. Menin. Breve storico compendio della Guerra d'Italia dell'anno 1796–1797. Verona, Biblioteca civica, 1997.
- F. Bonafini. Verona 1797: il furore di una città. Verona, Morelli, 1997.
- E. Santi. Le Pasque Veronesi. Ronco all'Adige, Comune di Ronco all'Adige, 1997.
- F. M. Agnoli. Le Pasque veronesi: quando Verona insorse contro Napoleone. Rimini, Il Cerchio, 1998. ISBN 88-86583-47-8.
- F. M. Agnoli. I processi delle Pasque veronesi: gli insorti veronesi davanti al tribunale militare rivoluzionario francese. Rimini, Il Cerchio, 2002. ISBN 88-8474-008-8
- A. Maffei. Dalle Pasque Veronesi alla pace di Campoformido. Rimini, Il Cerchio, 2005. ISBN 88-8474-101-7
