= Torre dei Lamberti =

Medieval tower in Verona, Italy

Coordinates: 45°26′35.11″N 10°59′51.79″E

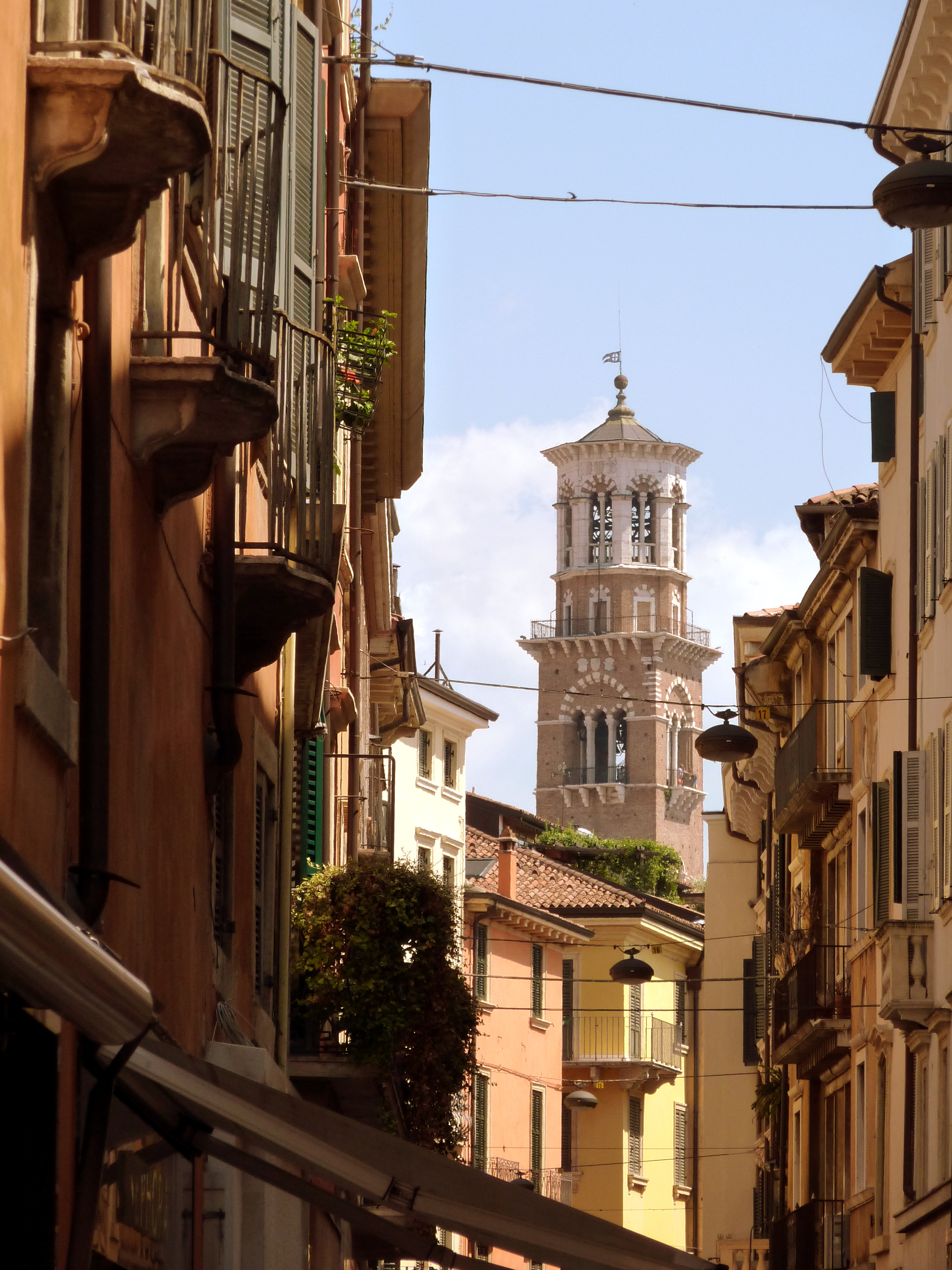
A view of Torre dei Lamberti from the city streets.

The Torre dei Lamberti is an 84 m high tower in Verona, northern Italy. Known as "ancient and famous", construction of the tower began in 1172.

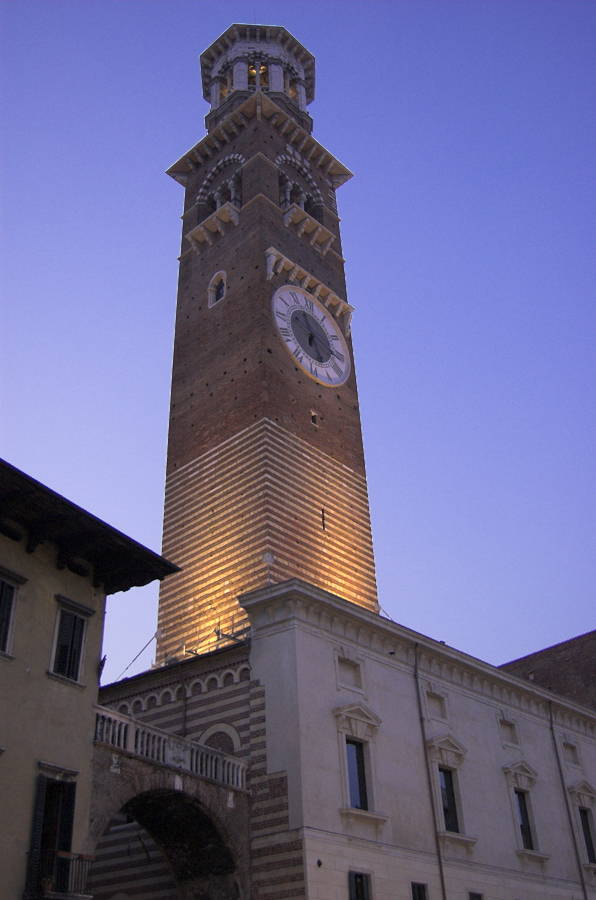

In May 1403, the top of the tower was struck by lightning, but restoration works did not commence until 1448, lasting for 16 years. During this period, the tower was expanded, with the newer sections distinguishable today by their use of different materials, such as marble. The prominent clock was added in 1779.

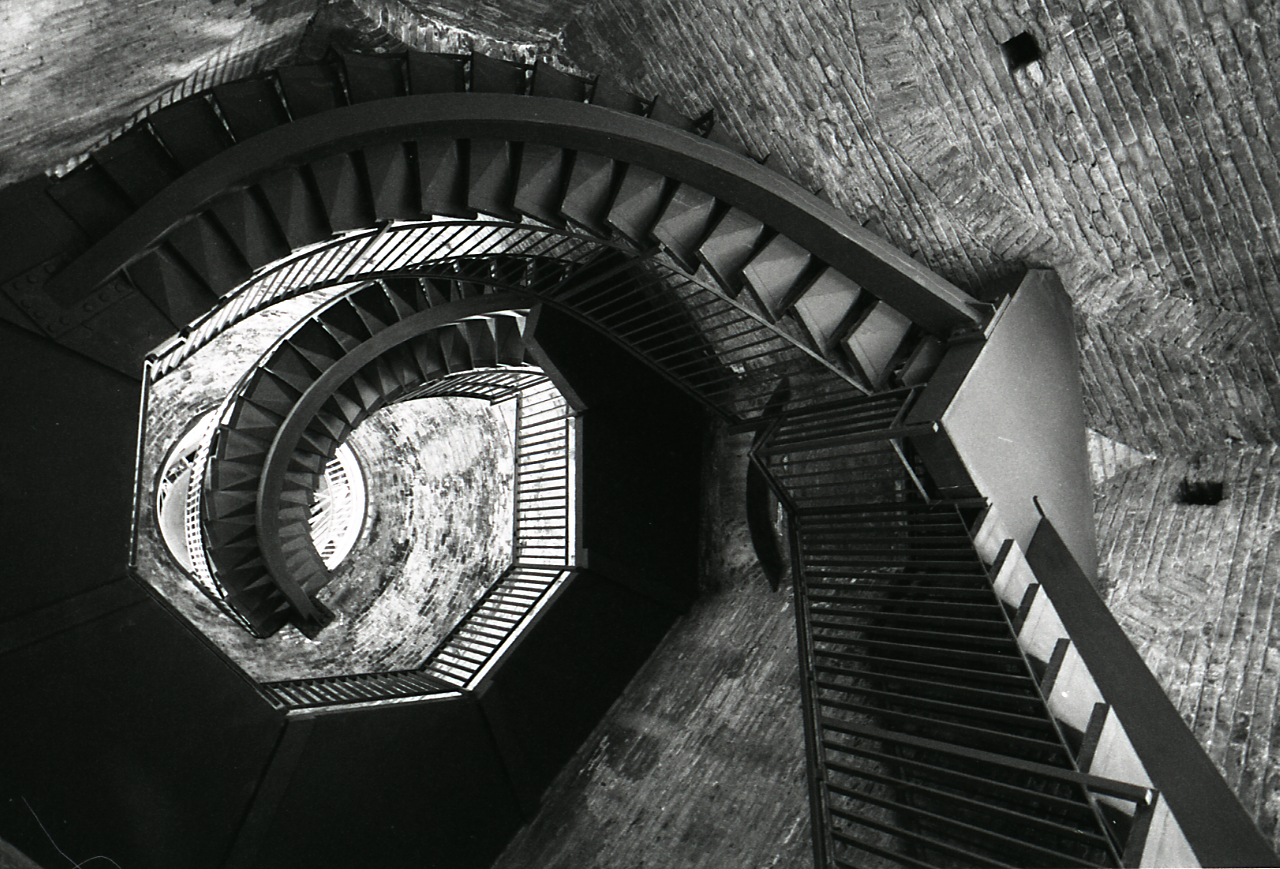
The spiral stair inside the tower. Photo by Paolo Monti, 1972.

The tower houses two bells: the Marangona, which signals fires, work times, and the hours of the day, and the larger one, called Rengo, used to summon the population to arms or to convene the city's councils. It was used for this purpose during the revolt called Veronese Easter in 1797.
