= Cappelletti (cavalry) =

Cappelletti regiments Reggimento Croati a Cavallo Cavalleria Oltramarina
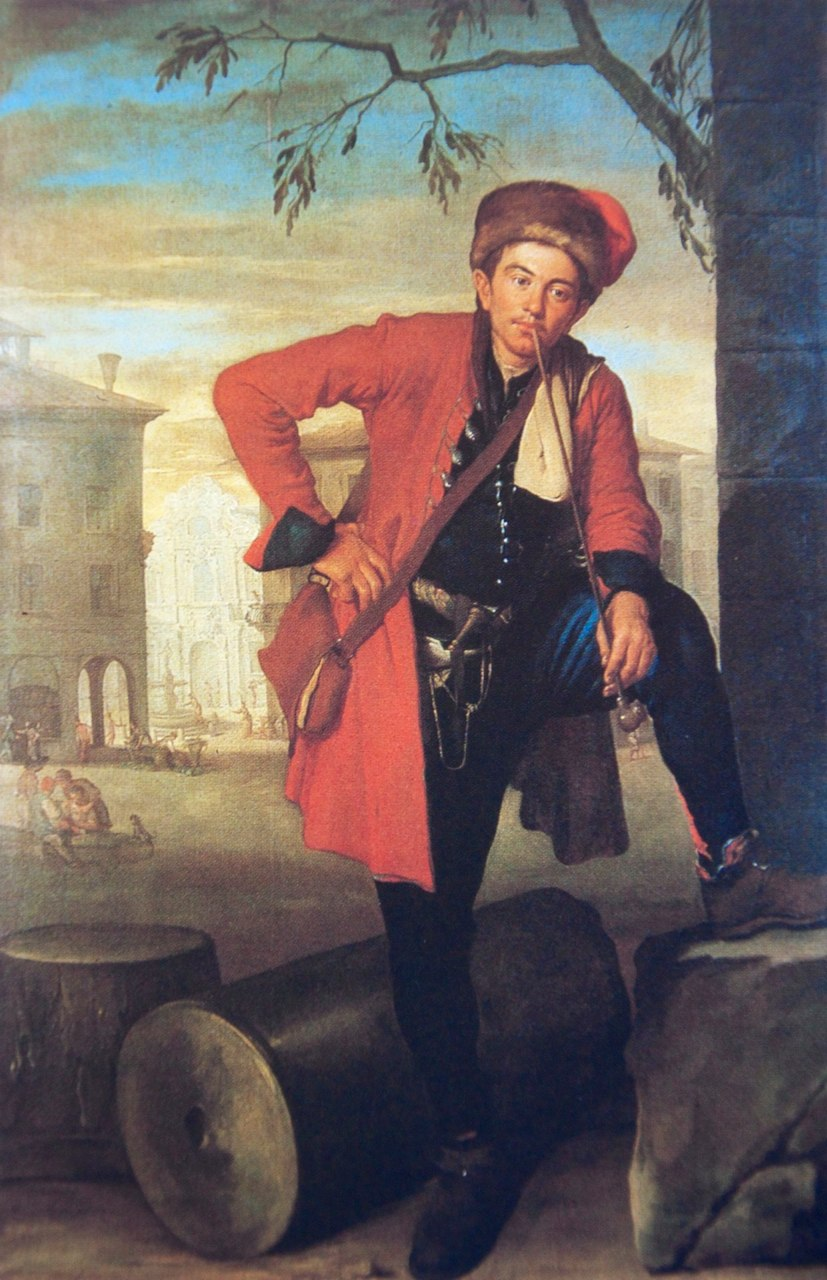
- 18th-century Dalmatian Croat Dragoon in Venetian service
- Founded: 15th century
- Disbanded: 12 May 1797
- Country: Republic of Venice
- Type: Dragoon
- Role: Light cavalry
- Size: 2 regiments of around 300 men each In war up to 4 regiments (1714)
- Headquarters: Zadar
- Nickname: "Kapeleti"
- Patron: Jerome
- Motto: "Viva San Marco"
- Colors: Dark blue Scarlet
- Anniversaries: Battle of Lepanto (7 October)
- Wars: See list: Wars in Lombardy; Ottoman–Venetian War (1463–1479); Wars in Lombardy; Milanese War of Succession; Italian War of 1494–1495; Ottoman–Venetian War (1499–1503); Ottoman–Venetian War (1537–1540); Ottoman–Venetian War (1570–1573); Uskok War; Cretan War (1645–1669); Morean War; Ottoman–Venetian War (1714–1718); Fall of the Republic of Venice

Cappelletti, later Croati à cavallo (lit. 'Croats on horse'), or Cavalleria Oltramarina, was a cavalry unit of the Republic of Venice. In the beginning, they were organized as part of the Dalmatian Oltremarini corps as light cavalry for the surveillance of the Venetian border in Dalmatia, but also as a police unit.

== History ==
Military elites of the eastern Adriatic, militias of Dalmatian cities, and war bands of Croatian nobles of Istria and Dalmatia fought under the Venetian flag already in the 13th century in the wars against Genoa, and in the dynastic wars for the control of Dalmatia against Hungary, and in the opening wars against the Ottoman Empire. At the end of the 15th century, it was from these warrior elites that the first commanders and mercenaries of Venetian professional units of naval infantry and light cavalry, originating from Dalmatia, the so-called "Schiavoni", would emerge.

The fall of the Zadar hinterland under Ottoman rule in the early 16th century resulted in the migration of the Croatian nobility (Knights from Posedarje and Bribir) to the coastal cities (Zadar, Biograd, Šibenik). Nobles took with them the members of their household. Venice formed elite military units from this Croatian military core, which continued the anti-Turkish fight under the Venetian flag as cappelletti. Probably the most famous member of the Dalmatian chapels was the Zadar nobleman and poet Brne Karnarutić, who participated in the Fourth Venetian-Ottoman War as a captain of the Croatian cavalry (Capitaneus equitum Croatorum).

Together with related units of the Greek and Albanian Stratioti, they were the main border unit of the Republic of Venice. After the fall of the Venetian Greek possessions, the Stratioti gradually disappeared from historical sources, and were completely replaced by the cappelletti in the 17th century. Finally, in the 1720s with the reorganization of the Venetian armed forces, the cavalry corps was divided into light and heavy cavalry. The heavy cavalry consisted of 2 regiments of cuirassiers, while the light cavalry was divided into 4 regiments of dragoons (from Terraferma) and 2 regiments of Croati à cavallo from Dalmatia. All regiments had around 300 horsemen each.

== Gallery ==
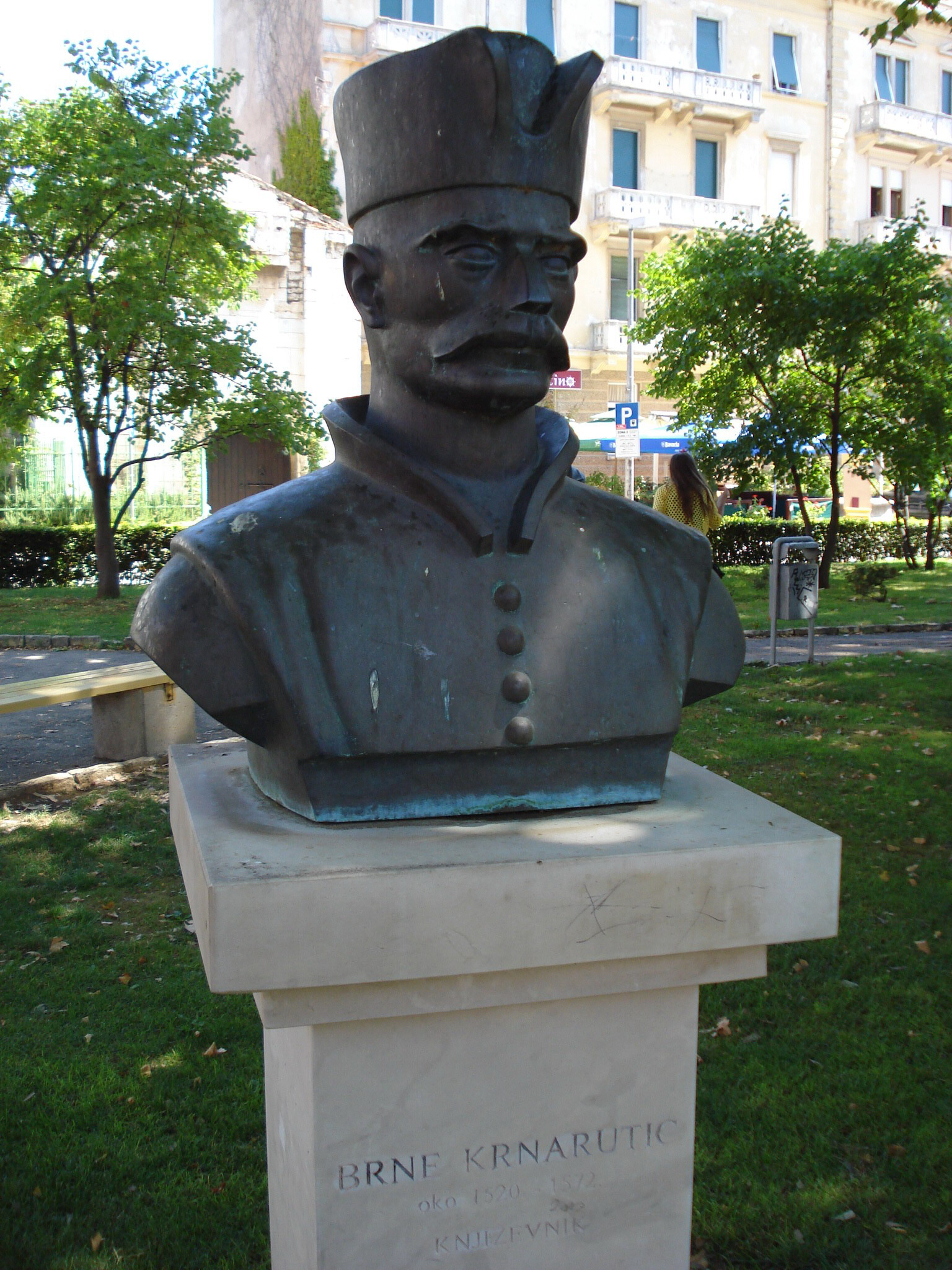
Poet Brne Krnarutic in cavalry uniform, statue in Zadar.

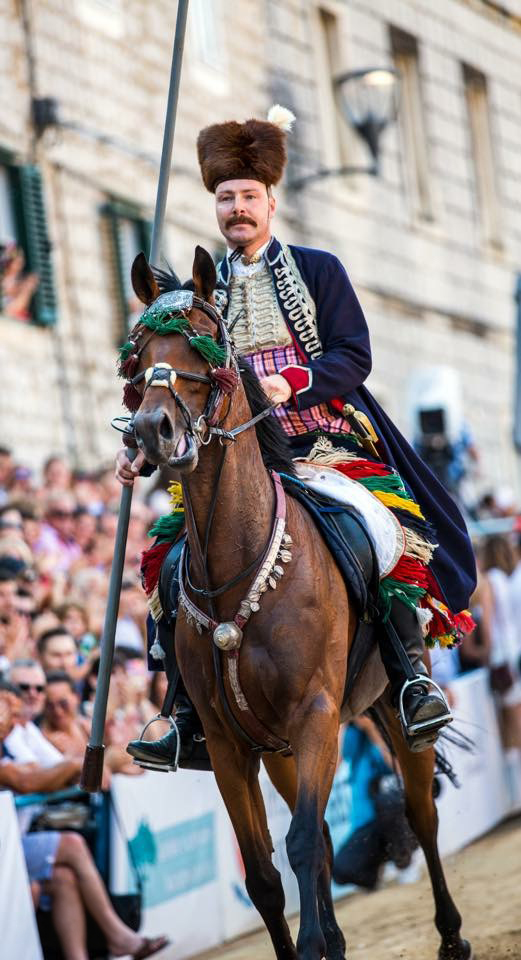
Alkar, the alkar uniform is an 18th-century representation of the Croatian horseman uniform in Venetian service from the southern Dalmatia.

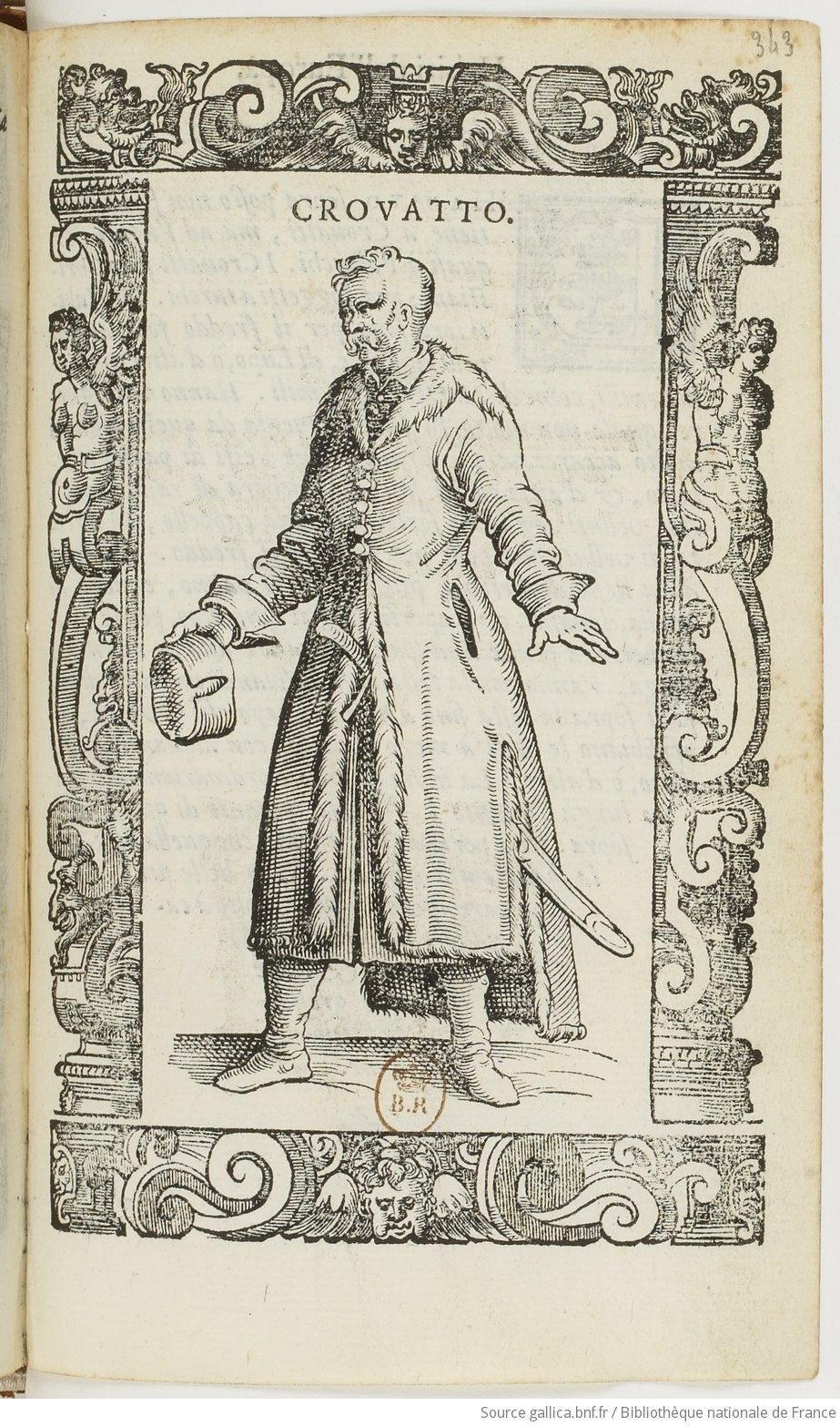
Portrait of a Croat horseman, Venice, 1590, Cesare Vecellio
