= Cernida =

The cernide or cernida (also known as the cranide in Dalmatia) were territorial armies of the Veneto and Istria that annually received some military training. The name cernida derives from the fact that the one or two young men were chosen (cf. Italian: cernere 'to choose, select') for every ten from among the young men resident in these areas.

These units could thus be mobilized quickly, unlike the army, which was slower to recruit and slower moving. They were formed of soldiers on annual service, with an obligation to gather for brief training periods four times a year, and accounted in total for about 30,000 men.
