= Angelo Emo =

Venetian naval officer (1731–1792)

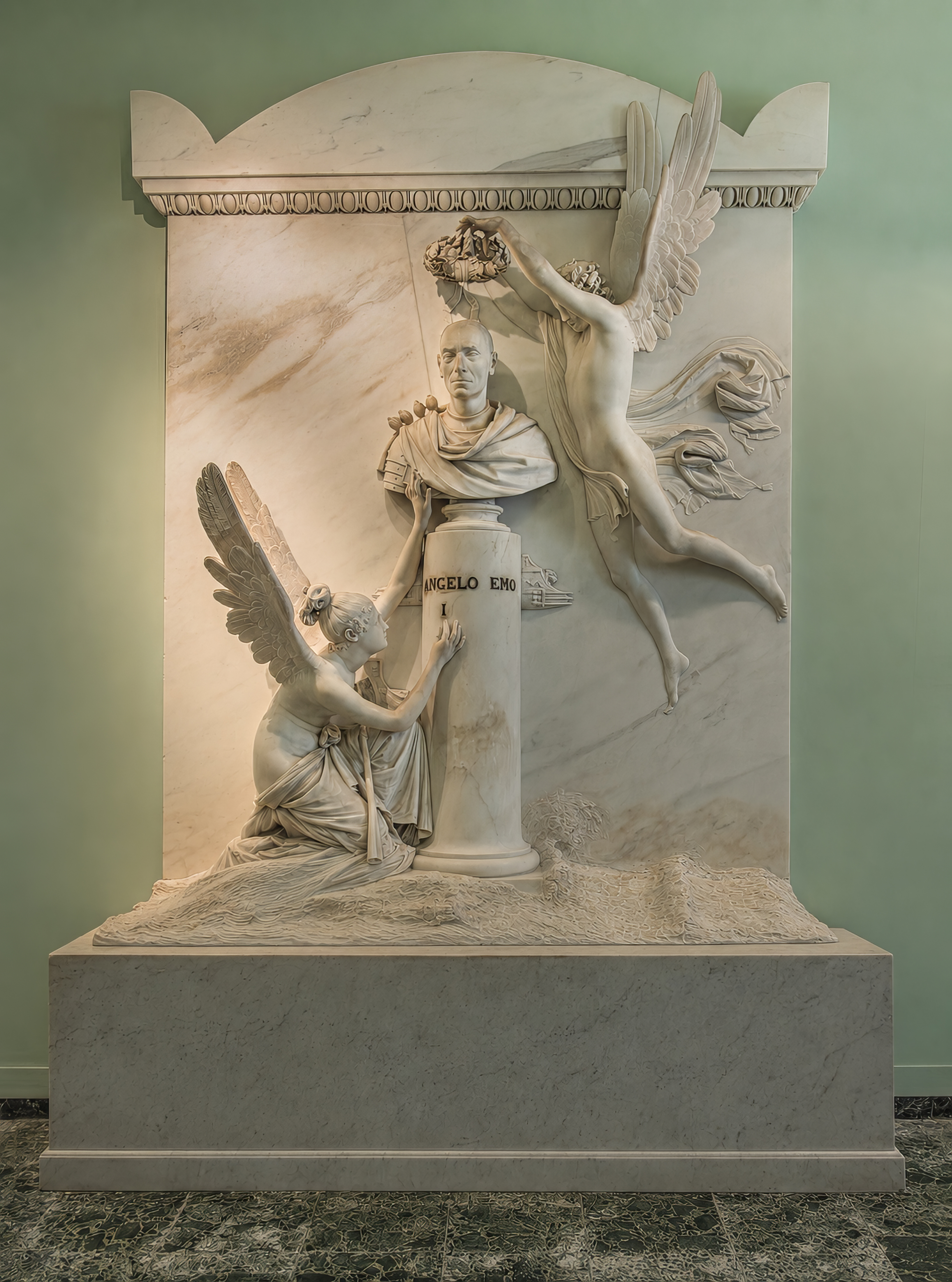
- Monument to Admiral Angelo Emo by Antonio Canova - Naval History Museum
- Born: 3 January 1731; Venice, Republic of Venice
- Died: 1 March 1792 (aged 61) La Valletta, Hospitaller Malta
- Buried: San Biagio, Venice (since 1817)
- Allegiance: Republic of Venice
- Branch: Venetian navy
- Service years: 1752–1792
- Rank: Capitano Straordinario delle Navi; Provveditore Generale da Mar
- Conflicts: Venetian bombardments of the Beylik of Tunis

Angelo Emo (3 January 1731 – 1 March 1792) was a Venetian naval officer. He is notable for his reforms of the Venetian navy and his naval campaigns, being regarded as the last great admiral of the Venetian Republic.

The scion of a distinguished family, Emo received an excellent education, and began his naval career as a cadet in 1752. He was quickly recognized for his ability and given his first command of a ship of the line two years later. In 1758, he was sent to cover the return of a trade convoy from London at the head of a squadron of three ships. Adverse weather resulted in a near-shipwreck for his ships, which suffered heavy casualties. In this episode, Emo gave proof of his determination and seamanship, earning acclaim both abroad and at home. Returning to Venice in 1759, over the following years he alternated between naval commands and administrative appointments in Venice, in which he invariably pursued modernizing and reformist policies. As naval commander, he led the Venetian fleet in shows of force against the Barbary states, as well as shadowing the Russian fleet in the Russo-Turkish War of 1768–1774.

In 1775, he proposed naval reforms based on the practices of the British Royal Navy, but was not able to convert them into practice until 1782, when he was given control of the Arsenal of Venice: new techniques were introduced, training and pay were improved, and new warships were constructed. Among others, the floating cannon platform.In 1784–1785 Emo led the Venetian fleet in a series of raids on the harbours of the Beylik of Tunis in retaliation for corsair attacks on Venetian-flagged shipping, but his requests for a landing to capture Tunis were rejected. He spent the last years of his life in anti-piracy patrols, and died after a brief illness on 1 March 1792. His body was returned to Venice, where he received a hero's funeral, and a funerary monument by the sculptor Antonio Canova was commissioned in his honour.

== Biography ==
=== Early life ===
Angelo Emo was born in Venice in January 1731; the exact date is usually given as 3 January, but this is uncertain, as some sources mention the 4th or 5th as his birthday, with one source claiming the 23rd. He was born at the Palazzo Emo, in the parish of San Simeone Piccolo, which formerly had belonged to the Diedo family. He hailed from a distinguished aristocratic family, which claimed to have been resident in Venice since the last years of the 10th century; but with few exceptions, its members had not played a major role in Venetian politics until the 18th century. Angelo Emo's father, Giovanni di Gabriele, had reached the position of Procurator of Saint Mark, the highest distinction for a Venetian citizen below that of Doge of Venice. His mother was Lucia Lombardo, his father's second wife. Angelo Emo was the third child of his father, having an older sister, Fiordaliso, and an older brother, Alvise or Luigi, from Giovanni's first marriage to Apollonia Bon; and a younger sister, Cecilia. His first cousin on his mother's side, Giacomo Nani, born in 1725, also became a notable admiral a few years ahead of Emo himself.

Emo was of mediocre stature, slight build and pale complexion, and stood out for his wide forehead, thick eyebrows, and large eyes. Historical accounts portray him in later life as a difficult, stubborn and haughty character. To prevent the dispersal of the family fortune, younger sons in the Emo family tended not to marry; accordingly, for Angelo Emo, an ecclesiastical career was envisaged. As a result, at the age of twelve he was educated at the Jesuit college in Brescia, before returning to Venice in 1748, where which his father chose as his tutors the scholars Giovanni Battista Bilesimo, Jacopo Stellini, and Carlo Lodoli. The beneficiary of an excellent humanistic education, the young Emo distinguished himself in philosophy, but not so much in other scholarly pursuits. During his studies, Emo was repeatedly urged to enter holy orders, but refused. He was an ardent student of Venetian history, whose military achievements he sought to emulate in later life, as well as the ancient Roman historian Tacitus, who became his favourite author.

=== Start of a naval career ===
By law, the traditional Venetian cursus honorum for a young nobleman began with a four-year service in the Venetian navy. Emo entered service around 1751, becoming a Nobile di Nave (gentleman cadet). In 1752, he went on his first sea voyage, escorting the Venetian trade convoy to Smyrna. The voyage proved adventurous: his ship, the large frigate San Vincenzo, went up in flames and sank at the anchorage at Govino Bay in Corfu, on 11 May. Emo proved a quick learner in naval matters, and his first commander remarked on his promise as a naval officer. His rise was rapid, and in January 1755 he was promoted to captain (Governatore di Nave) of a first-rate (Note: According to Venetian nomenclature, largely for prestige reasons, as these were the heaviest vessels in the Venetian fleet. By contemporary British practice these ships would be considered third-rates, and second-rates according to French practice.) ship, the 74-gun ship of the line Sant'Ignazio.

During the 18th century, the Venetian maritime trade, that had once dominated the Mediterranean, was in decline. The wealthy patricians preferred reliable investments in their estates in the Terraferma to the hazards of the sea, the emergence of new commercial centres such as Livorno and Trieste siphoned traffic off from Venice, attacks by pirates were a constant threat, and the Genoese, Dutch and English merchants had come to dominate the westward routes into the Atlantic. Attacks by the Barbary pirates of the Ottoman-aligned principalities of Algiers and Tunis, as well as raids by the smaller Dalmatian pirate towns of Bar (Antivari) and Ulcinj (Dulcigno) were also a constant threat. The main task of the Venetian fleet, based at Corfu, was to safeguard Venetian shipping against such attacks. The interruption caused by the War of the Austrian Succession had allowed the Venetian government, which remained neutral, the opportunity to try and seize back a share of trade with the Atlantic ports of Western Europe, equipping new and better ships and providing subsidies to merchants. Venetian successes proved ephemeral, as the end of the war in 1748 had allowed the English and Dutch traders to resume their voyages, but for some time the Venetian government continued to attempt to revive its Atlantic trade. The Venetian navy had also declined during the same time; after the Treaty of Passarowitz in 1718 and especially after the reconfirmation of the treaty in 1733 and 1736, the danger of a new war with the Ottoman Empire receded, and despite occasional war scares the naval establishment was cut back as the Republic pursued an increasingly passive foreign policy centred on a strict neutrality.

Ships being constructed at the Arsenal of Venice were left in a semi-finished state for decades—the first-rate Forza was finished after 55 years—while at the same time, the Arsenal itself entered a period of neglect and increasing technical obsolescence, coupled with corruption and repeated, but fruitless, attempts at reform. This situation threatened even Venice's control over its maritime heartland, the Adriatic Sea (or 'Gulf of Venice', as the Republic liked to boast), which became exposed to pirate attacks and encroachment by the new Habsburg naval centres of Trieste and Fiume. By 1756, the Venetian sailing fleet at Corfu had been reduced to a historic low of seven vessels, but there were twenty further ships mothballed in a near-ready state in the Arsenal of Venice, and the rise in Barbary piratical attacks obliged the Venetian authorities to start putting them into service. During these years, Emo distinguished himself in escort duties of the trade convoys to Smyrna, repelling the attacks of pirates, especially the Dulcignoti, from whose hands he recaptured a Venetian merchant vessel. He then commanded the second-rate Speranza of 58 guns.

In 1758, Emo assumed command of the 74-gun first-rate San Carlo Borromeo, then the newest ship of the line of the Venetian fleet, and lead ship of its class. In this command, Emo tested a new mast configuration—rather than made out of single tree-trunks, they were composed from different pieces of wood—inspired by English models. Emo gave a display of the new mast's abilities while carrying the new Provveditore Generale da Mar, Francesco Grimani, to his seat at Corfu: faced with strong northeastern wind, instead of reefing or reducing his sails, Emo ordered full sails set to test and demonstrate the new masts, until Grimani ordered him to reduce sail.

=== Expedition to Portugal ===
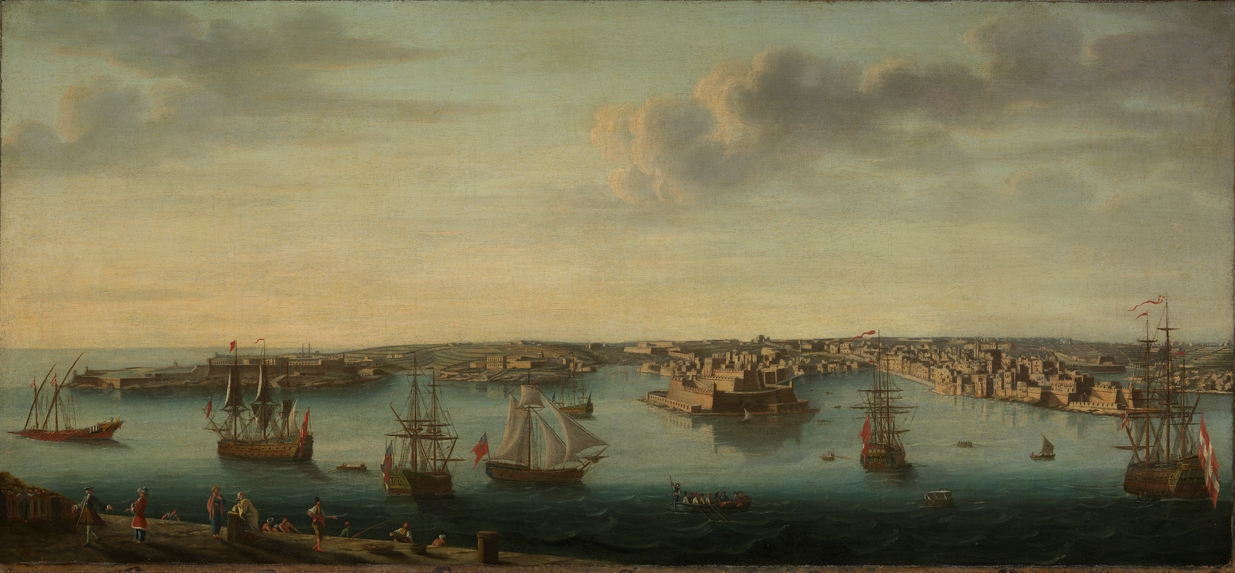
View of the Grand Harbour of Malta in the 1750s

As part of these attempts, in 1758 Emo was charged to lead an expedition to Lisbon, in order to await the arrival and cover the return of six Venetian merchantmen from London and protect them from anticipated Barbary pirate attacks. He was given a squadron of three ships, comprising the San Carlo Borromeo, the second-rate (also designated a 'large frigate') San Vincenzo Ferrer of 58 guns, and the 28-gun frigate Costanza, all of them fairly newly built ships. Emo's squadron left Corfu on 27 September 1758. Three days later, it reached Malta, where it gathered intelligence on the Barbary pirates, and in vain tried to find a competent pilot who knew the Atlantic waters up to Lisbon.

Emo set sail westward in mid-October. Contrary winds delayed the voyage near Málaga, before the Venetians were able to cross the Strait of Gibraltar and make for Lisbon. Unfortunately for Emo, his pilot mistook Cape da Roca for Cape Espichel, and almost wrecked the San Carlo by drawing near the shore. Emo realized the mistake and tried to correct course, but the heavy wind made the manoeuvre difficult. Emo had to reduce sail, and had to go through three sets of sails as they were ripped apart by the wind. The San Carlo managed to clear the Berlengas islands, but the other two vessels were left behind in the process. After two days of struggle with the wind, Emo anchored at the mouth of the Mondego River, but almost immediately the ship lost its tiller. A new tiller was laboriously installed, but it broke apart during the night, followed soon after by the entire rudder. Some of his officers panicked and suggested beaching the ship, but Emo managed to restore discipline. He made contact with the shore, and with the help of the British vice-consul at Figueira arranged for Portuguese ships to tow the San Carlo to Lisbon.

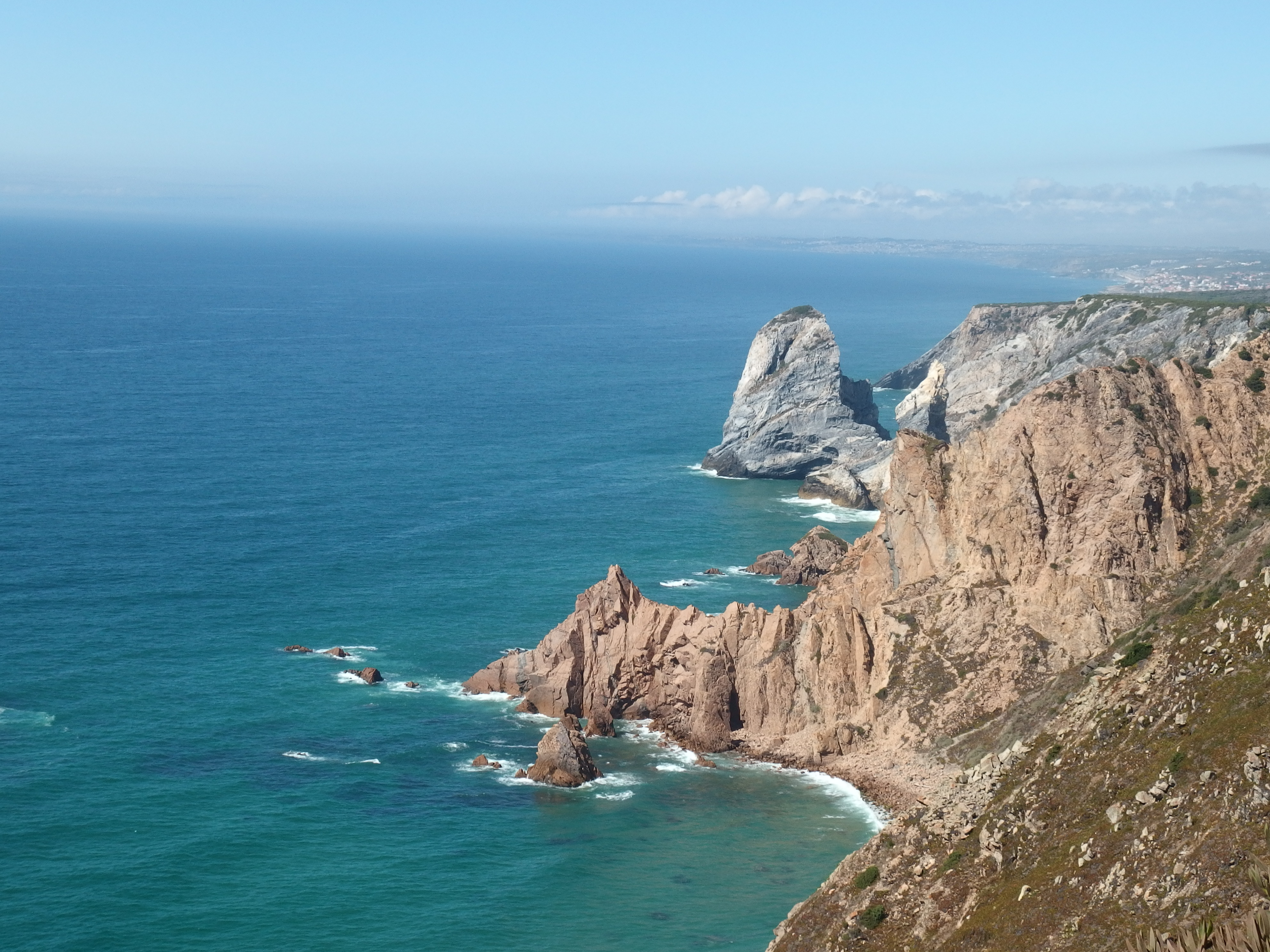
Sea cliffs north of Cape da Roca

At Cape da Roca, a hard easterly wind forced the towing vessels to abandon the effort. The San Carlo was left to drift rudderless for several days, while the crew tried to jury-rig a new rudder. The Costanza, also heavily damaged and leaking water, was sighted and the two ships remained in contact for a day, before they drifted apart again. Water supplies on board the San Carlo ran low. A makeshift rudder was installed, which allowed the ship to once again reach the Cape da Roca, before yet another violent wind came from the south and drove the San Carlo to the north. The new rudder had to be cut free, and only with great difficulty, by sailing stern first, did the crew narrowly avoid a shipwreck at the Berlengas.

The crew by this time had been reduced by accident, illness and fatigue from 590 to some 130 men. Although the ship suffered damage to its masts and rigging, it managed to reach a spot further north of its original anchorage at the mouth of the Mondego. This time, Emo went ashore in person and obtained the help of the local Portuguese governor. It took 17 days for a new rudder to be constructed, and five more for it to be installed on the ship, whose effective crew was down to 70, most of whom were inexperienced and exhausted soldiers. Accidents continued while Emo tried out his repaired ship, but at long last he was able to turn it south to Lisbon, entering the Tagus River on 5 February 1759. There he found his other two ships: the San Vincenzo had got in on 8 December, and the Costanza on 22 December.

At Lisbon, where Emo's struggle with the elements and misfortune had been followed with great interest, he was received by King Joseph I with the honours due to an ambassador. Taking charge of the Venetian merchant ships from London, he returned home via Genoa and Naples with little incident, reaching Corfu in mid-July 1759. Over the course of the voyage, the San Carlo had no fewer than 250 dead, while the San Vincenzo suffered 90 dead and the Costanza four. 76 more crewmen (from an original total crew of 1236 for the entire squadron) deserted. Emo's conduct during the voyage gave proof of his seamanship and command skills, earning acclaim from the government on his return to Venice in August. Nevertheless, Emo's decision to press on without qualified pilots, while possibly taken under the impression of the urgency of his mission, led to recriminations by some contemporaries and historians. Officially, the near-disaster was attributed to bad design on the San Carlo, which underwent refits and modifications as a result, but ended up sinking with all hands during another tempest in 1768.

=== Civilian offices and rise to high command ===
Following Venetian tradition, a military appointment was followed by a civilian one. Thus in 1760 Emo was Provvedditore della Sanità (health commissioner), an appointment which Emo accepted, but only reluctantly. As the historian Federico Moro states, for a career naval officer this posting amounted to a "humiliation", and is difficult to interpret as anything but an unofficial—given the prominence of his family, a more severe penalty was unlikely—reprimand for his actions in Portugal. Emo nevertheless executed his duties with zeal and severity, and after the termination of its yearly tenure was elected as Savio ed Esecutore alle Acque (water commissioner) in 1761–62. In this capacity he commissioned a plan of the Venetian Lagoon, which was completed in six months. So accurate was this plan that it continued in use until well into the 19th century.

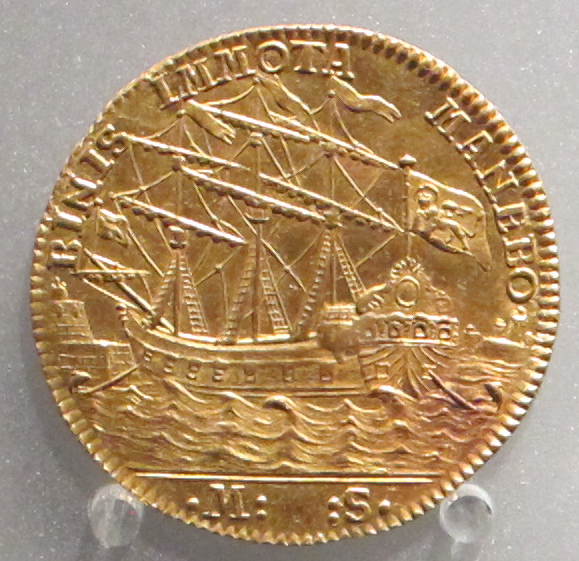
Osella celebrating Emo's anti-pirate successes, 1765

In 1763 Emo finally returned to the navy, being elected to the higher command rank of Patron delle Navi (rear admiral of the sailing fleet) and charged with anti-piracy operations in the Adriatic Sea. The election was not smooth, however: in the first election, the post was given to Alvise da Riva instead, and only when the latter resigned after finding conditions at sea too severe, was Emo elected to replace him. The reasons for the initial rebuff, which temporarily threw Emo into despair, are unclear. Da Riva may have enjoyed more political support, which he mobilized to gain the post, as a naval command could be a springboard for higher office. At the same time, Emo's cousin, Giacomo Nani, was Capitano delle Navi, full admiral of the sailing fleet at the same time, and concerns may have existed about concentrating control of the navy in the hands of a single clan. Instead of directly proceeding to join the fleet at Corfu by sea, however, Emo travelled overland through Italy, visiting Florence, Rome, and Naples, where he was received by King Charles VII, before embarking at Otranto. During the next sixteen months of his tenure, Emo dedicated himself to escorting merchant vessels against pirate attacks. His main achievement was the recovery of two Venetian vessels and their entire cargo from the Dulcignoti, an achievement celebrated in the osella minted in that year (1765). In the same year Emo was promoted to Almirante (vice admiral of the sailing fleet).

In contrast to the sustained anti-piracy efforts in the Adriatic, in the 1760s Venice opted for a different policy against the Barbary states. Accords were concluded with Algiers and Tunis in 1763, Tripoly in 1764, and Morocco in 1765, whereby the rulers of these states would prevent pirate attacks on Venetian shipping in the Adriatic and a zone of 30 nautical miles around the Ionian Islands, against a payment of a hefty annual tribute. The Barbary rulers did not always abide by the agreements; in 1766, Emo's cousin, Giacomo Nani, had to lead a naval demonstration off Tripoli to ensure the release of a captured Venetian vessel. In the next year, it was Emo's turn to conduct a similar operation against Algiers, whose bey tried to extort an increase in the annual sums agreed upon, and took Venetian ships and their crews captive. Emo sailed to Algiers with the frigate Ercole, joined by San Michele Archangele and Costanza, and threatened to bombard the city. The Bey of Algiers released the ships and their crews, paid reparations, and renewed the treaty with Venice to its previous terms. Emo then headed to Marseille, where he purchased two xebecs for service with the Venetian fleet. The Republic honoured Emo with appointment to the Order of the Golden Stole, and sent Emo's brother, Alvise, to Marseille to convey him the Order's insignia. On 12 June 1768, Emo was raised to Capitano delle Navi.

=== Russo-Turkish War ===
When the Russian fleet under Alexei Orlov arrived in the Mediterranean in 1770 as part of the Russo-Turkish War of 1768–1774, Emo led a Venetian squadron to cruise in the Aegean, to shadow the Russians, and protect Venetian and French subjects and commercial interests in the area. Emo fulfilled his instructions in exemplary fashion, providing constant updates on Russian operations and perceptive reports on Russian strategy during the war. The conflict also saw raids by the pirates of Ulcinj, ostensibly acting as subjects of the Ottoman Sultan, against the Venetian Ionian Islands. Emo pursued them at Kythira (Cerigo) and recovered two captured ships.

Emo's fleet suffered heavy losses when it was caught in a storm near Cape Matapan on 19 December 1771: half his squadron, the 74-gun Corriera and the 28-gun frigate Tolleranza, foundered off Elos, the former with almost all hands. Emo's own flagship, the 74-gun Ercole, only survived by cutting her masts. Emo himself was swept into the sea during the manoeuvre and was rescued with difficulty by his crew. Distraught over what he perceived as a personal failure, Emo offered to donate his private fortune to make up for the losses.

Emo's naval command expired in 1772. He entered the Venetian Senate, as well as going abroad, visiting the courts of Frederick II of Prussia and Maria Theresa of Austria. Elected several times as censor, he worked to revive the manufacture of Murano glass.

Emo was named to a seven-member commission to examine reforms for the Venetian navy in March 1775. Although the parlous state of the Venetian navy was well known and had been a subject of debate and reform proposals for decades, nothing had been achieved. Emo authored the commission's report, the Scrittura sul sistemare la marina da guerra in cui eravi il cav. Emo e dettata dal cav. Emo stesso. The report recommended reforms on the model of the British Royal Navy, but although the commission numbered some influential senators, again its proposals failed to be taken up.

In 1776–1778, again in the post of Savio alle Acque, Emo was responsible for several maintenance works around the Lagoon, on the Brenta River, the Terraglio road, and the canal of Cava.

=== Demonstration off Tripoli ===
Emo again received a naval command on 18 July 1778, being elected Capitano delle Navi, with the heavy frigate Sirena as his flagship. His mission was to confront the Pashalik of Tripolitania, who tried to exploit the "right of search" accorded to them by treaty on Venetian shipping beyond the agreed-upon limits. Emo led his fleet in a demonstration of force in front of Tripoli, leading the pasha to conclude a new peace agreement with the Republic. Emo's appointment was renewed for the year after, but in the event it was not required for him to set sail.

In 1779, as a Savio alla Mercanzia (trade commissioner), Emo promoted reforms such as the reduction of tax on silk, the opening of new shops at Šibenik (Sebenico) and the transfer of the Venetian consulate in Egypt from Cairo to the port city of Alexandria. In 1780 he was a Provveditore ai Beni Inculti (commissioner on uncultivated lands) and laid out plans for the draining of the Valli Veronesi, the Adige marshlands around Verona, a project begun already by Zaccaria Betti. However, once again due to lack of funds, the plans were not carried out.

=== Director of the Arsenal and naval reforms ===
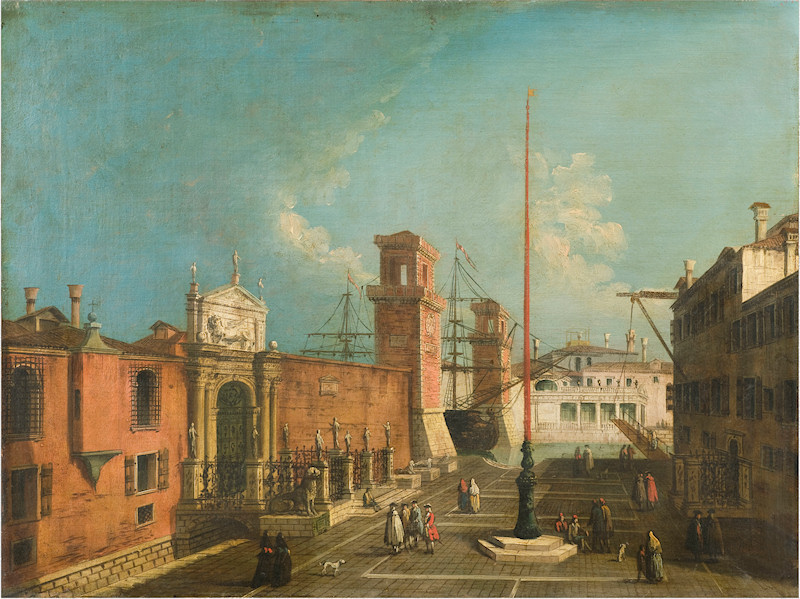
Entrance of the Arsenal in the 1740s

During the January 1782 visit of the Grand Duke Paul (the future Tsar Paul I of Russia) to Venice, Emo personally educated Paul on the details of the Venetian naval apparatus. When Venice resolved to send a permanent envoy to Saint Petersburg shortly after, Emo's name was on top of the list, but he managed to avoid the costly and unattractive appointment by pleading ill health. In 1783, as an extraordinary commissioner, Emo led the negotiations with the Habsburg envoy Philipp von Cobenzl on freedom of navigation in Istria and Dalmatia.

In 1782–1784 Emo served as one of the three extraordinary inquisitors on the Venetian Arsenal (Inquisitore Straordinario all'Arsenale). This appointment came on the initiative of the reformist senator Francesco Pesaro, and with the task of addressing the chronic problems plaguing this crucial institution. His fellow directors were Giovanni Zusto and Nicolò Erizzo. He imported new models of ships from England and France, introduced copper sheathing of warships to improve their speed and reduce the maintenance costs, and improved the methods for the manufacture of hawsers and rigging. He also increased the salaries of non-noble officers, introduced a theoretical training for naval cadets, as well as a publicly funded welfare scheme for invalid and aged sailors. Taking advantage of the sudden sinking of the ship of the line Fenice, while at anchor at Malamocco in 1783, the inquisitors were also able to break the stranglehold on naval constructions of the traditionalist-minded chief shipwrights (the proti) and replace them with a corps of naval architects. Using his own position as a senator and his connections in the Republic's government, Emo secured funds for the construction of new warships: 15 were laid down after his tenure and until the end of the Republic in 1797.

=== Naval campaigns against Tunis ===
On 6 March 1784 Emo was elected as Capitano Straordinario delle Navi (commander-in-chief of the sailing fleet) of a naval expedition against the Beylik of Tunis. The warlike new Bey, Hammuda ibn Ali, had become embroiled in a quarrel with the Republic that quickly escalated to warfare. When a Venetian ship laden with goods from Tunis was burned by the authorities in Malta due to it being infected with the plague, the Bey asked for an enormous compensation, and when the Venetian admiral Andrea Querini tried to negotiate, he was assaulted by a riot staged by the Bey. On 21 June, Emo sailed from Venice on a slow voyage to Corfu, where he was joined by more ships. His fleet comprised a few ships of the line, including Emo's flagship, the 64-gun Fama, a few xebecs, two bomb vessels, and a galiot. The fleet sailed for Tunis on 12 August.

Emo's squadron anchored at Cape Carthage, five miles from the city of Tunis, on 1 September. The Tunisian fleet, geared towards piracy against merchantmen, did not sail to oppose the Venetians, who were able to infiltrate the harbour of La Goulette during the night of the 3rd/4th and retake a Neapolitan merchant ship just captured by the pirates. After replenishing water and supplies in Sardinia, Emo sailed for Sousse, which he bombarded on 5–7 and 12 October, before the autumn storms forced him to return to winter in Trapani in Sicily and Malta.

Emo returned to the Tunisian shore in April 1785, anchoring at La Goulette. Negotiations with the Bey of Tunis failed, and Emo sailed back to Malta and Sicily. The Venetian fleet again bombarded Sousse intermittently (21 July 27 and 31 July – 4 August) due to the bad weather, but with meagre results. Sfax followed (15–17 August), before the fleet retired to Trapani again. After receiving reinforcements from Venice that raised his fleet to five first-rate ships of the line, one light frigate, two xebecs, one galiot, and the two bomb-vessels, Emo returned to La Goulette. It was here that Emo employed floating batteries of his own invention: large floats made of empty barrels, fortified with wet sandbags, and equipped with 40-pound guns and mortars. Along with the bomb-vessels, this gave the Venetians the ability to hit the settlements behind the sea walls during the nights of 3, 5, and 10 October. As the Bey remained obdurate, Emo dismantled his rafts and returned to Trapani.

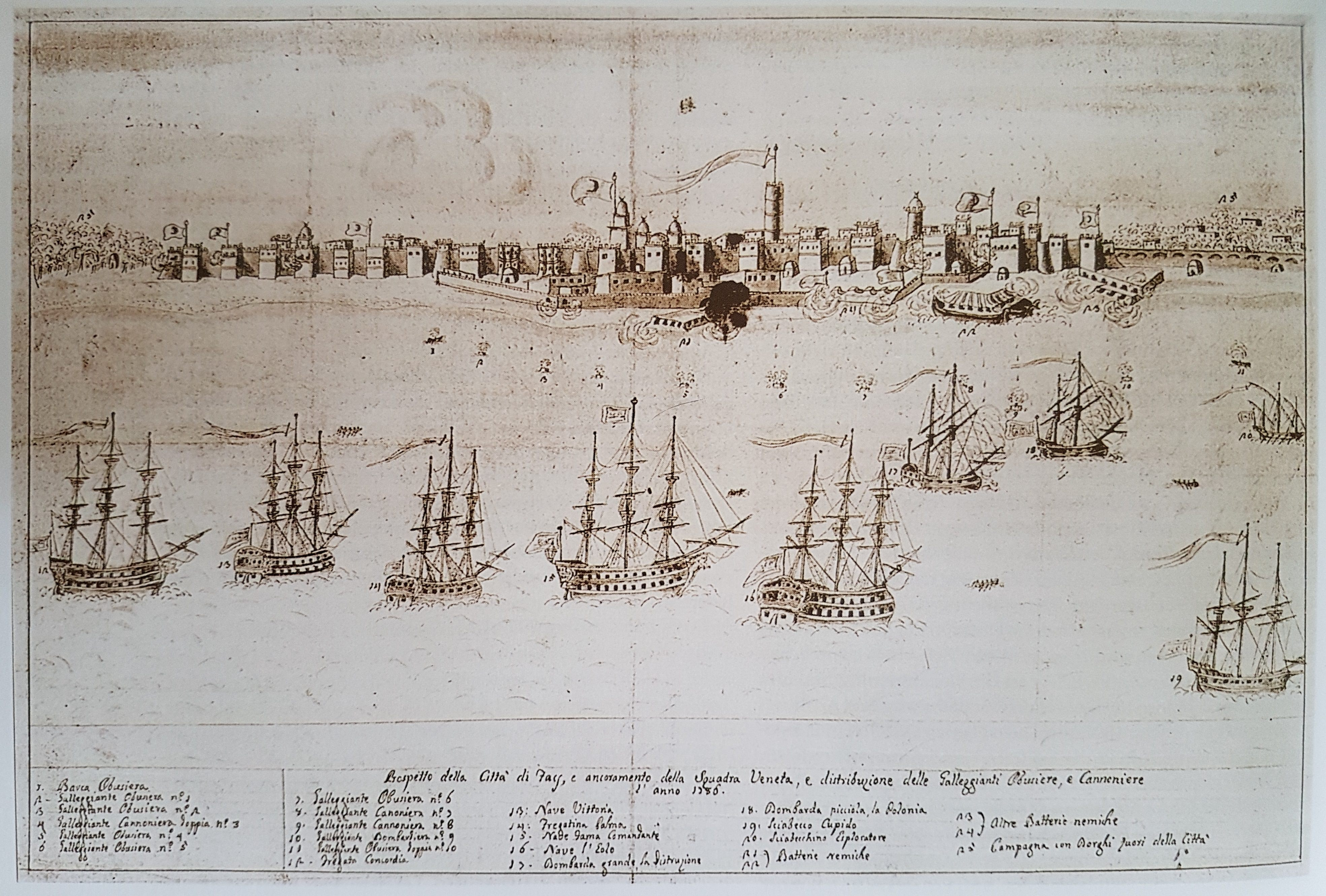
Sketch of the Venetian fleet bombarding Sfax

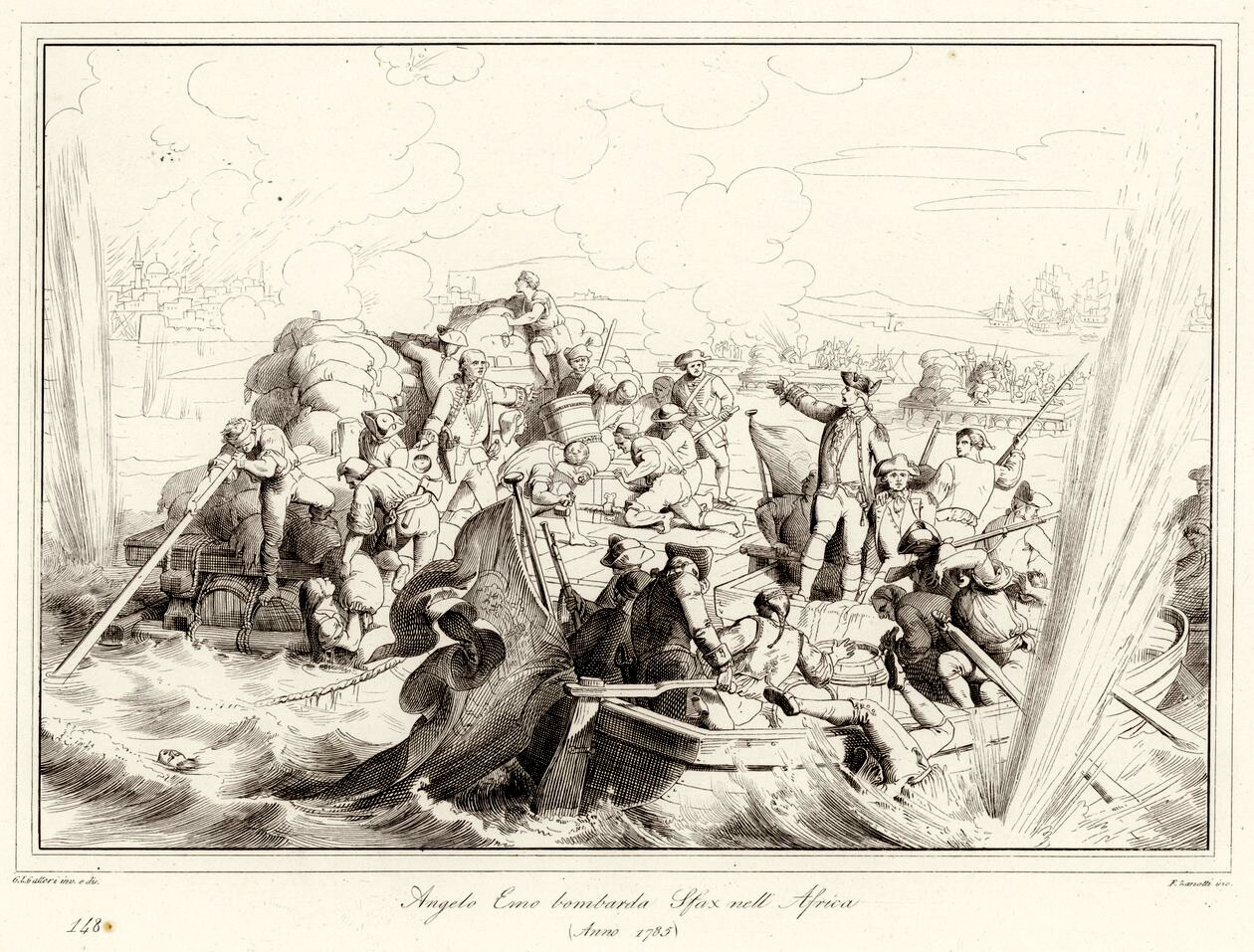
Angelo Emo bombards the city of Sfax with his floating batteries, from a drawing by Giuseppe Gatteri

As the Bey continued to insist on his previous demands, Emo returned to the Tunisian coast in early 1786, attacking Sfax (on 6, 18, and 22 March 30 April and 4 May). The Tunisians had prepared for his arrival, repairing their walls and installing heavy guns, leading to intense artillery duels between the city and the fleet. Emo too had appreciated the effect of his floating batteries, and had built more of them, with still heavier mortars; in nightly operations they were led up to the sea walls, and bombarded the city's interior with such devastating effect that the inhabitants of Sfax pleaded with the Bey to resume negotiations, to little effect. The Venetian fleet retired to Malta, where the news that Emo had been elected Procurator of Saint Mark on 28 May reached the fleet, an event that was celebrated for three days and nights. With the Bey still refusing to negotiate, Emo attacked Bizerte from 30 July to 10 August, and then, from 26 September to 6 October, Sousse, which now was left almost entirely in ruins.

These operations not only caused great damage and casualties in these cities, but also confined the Tunisian pirate fleet to its harbours. They also made Emo famous throughout Europe, where the images of his firework-like night bombardments kindled the imagination. Nevertheless, they failed to achieve their principal objective, namely to force the Bey of Tunis to the negotiating table. Venice, like the other European naval powers, preferred to reach an agreement with the pirates, including the annual payments, than engage in long, and far more expensive, military campaigns that would be required to thoroughly deal with the pirate threat. Thus Emo's requests of a 10,000-man expeditionary force with which to assault and capture the city of Tunis, were rejected by the Venetian Senate.

=== Final years and death ===
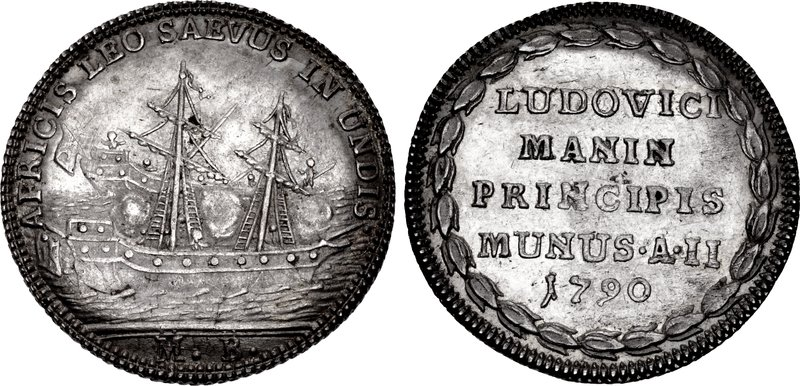
Silver medal issued in 1790, to celebrate the Venetian successes against the Barbary corsairs

In early 1787 the Senate recalled Emo with the bulk of his fleet, leaving only a small squadron under the Patron delle Navi Tommaso Condulmer to patrol the Tunisian coast. Emo's recall was likely connected to the imminent outbreak of another war between Russia and the Ottomans. Some alarm was caused by an Ottoman fleet that appeared off the coasts of Albania in August, but Emo, who shadowed its movements with a far more formidable force, was not worried. In the event, the Ottoman fleet's mission was merely to overawe the rebellious Pasha of Scutari; having accomplished that, it returned to its base in early 1788. Until 1791, Emo spent his time in anti-piracy cruises off the western coasts of Greece, with the exception of a foray into the Aegean in 1790 that brought him to Paros. For his efforts in combating the Tunisian pirates, the nobles of Zakynthos (Zante) awarded him with a golden sword and a medal.

In late 1790, the Senate named Emo Provveditore Generale da Mar, but did not entrust him with leading the fleet against the Tunisian coast. With the French Revolution under way in Europe, the Senate was loath to become embroiled in a prolonged conflict, and preferred peace. The Senate feared that Emo's aggressive nature would hamper these efforts, and instead placed Condulmer, promoted to Capitano delle Navi, in charge of the naval blockade and peace negotiations. In 1791, the Venetian government decided on a final show of force, reuniting the fleet of Emo with the squadron of Condulmer. The combined fleet demonstrated off the Tunisian coast from late August until returning to Malta in December. Hospitalized after a lung infection, Emo died at La Valetta, Malta on 1 March 1792. The story circulated that he had died from a bilious attack after learning that a peace, mostly disadvantageous to Venice, had been concluded with Tunis without his being consulted.

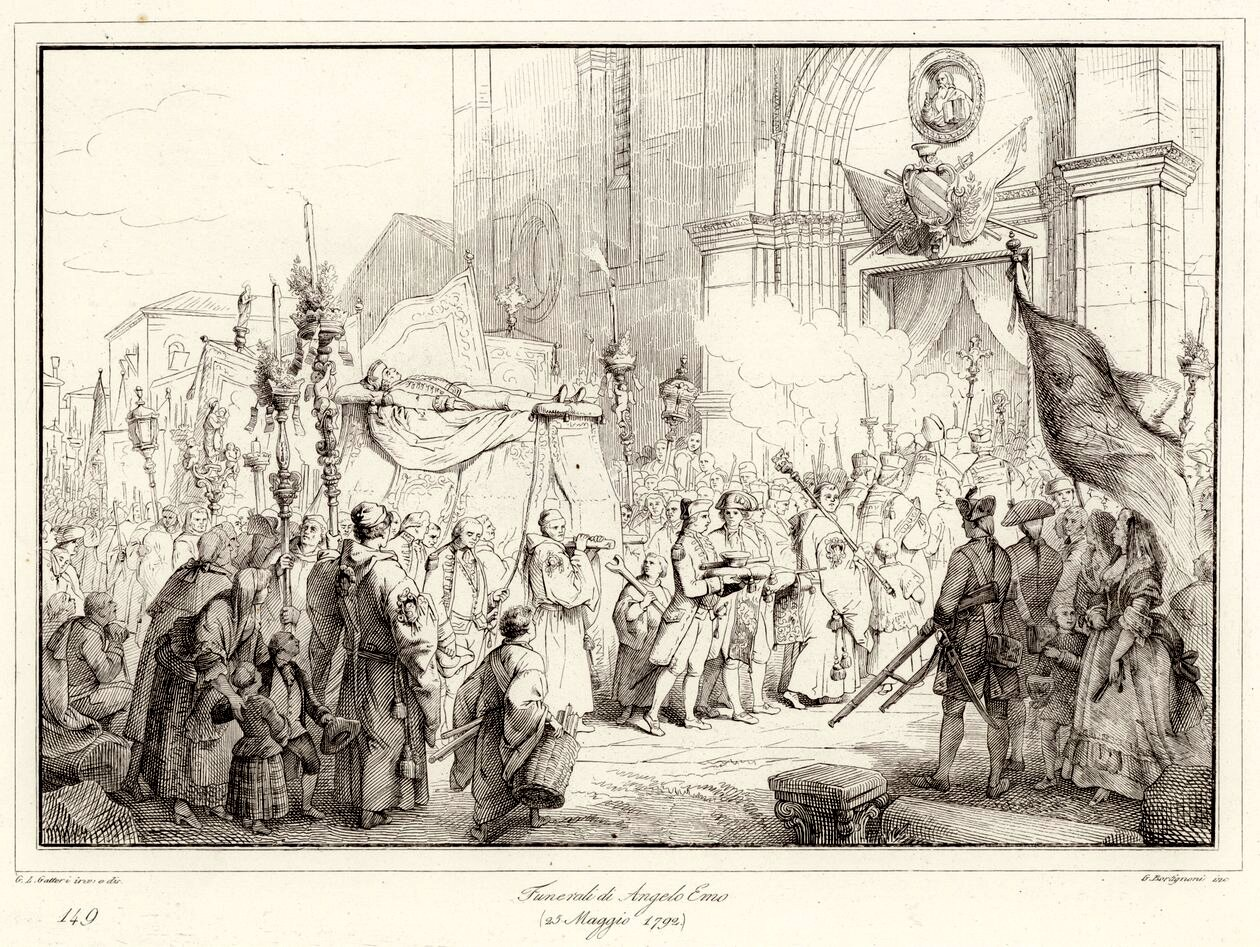
Emo's funeral, drawing by Giuseppe Gatteri

Celebrated as a great naval hero, his body was embalmed and carried to Venice on board his flagship, the Fama. The sculptor Antonio Canova was charged with erecting a monument to Emo. Completed in 1794, it is in the second armoury of the Venetian Arsenal. Canova was honoured by the Republic with a medal for this monument, the last such medal issued by the Republic before its end. His funeral took place at St Mark's on 17 April, and he was buried at the church of Santa Maria dei Servi. A funerary monument was erected over his tomb by Canova's teacher, Giovanni Ferrari, initially at Santa Maria dei Servi, then moved to San Martino, and finally, from 1817, to San Biagio.

== Legacy ==
Following the death of his older brother, Alvise Emo, in 1790, Angelo Emo's death also meant the end of the San Simeon Piccolo branch of the Emo family.

Already at the time of Emo's death, his loss was seen as a heavy blow and symptom of the Republic's decline. Emo's reputation was enhanced further by 19th-century historians of Venice, keen on romanticizing the final decades of the Republic: Girolamo Dandolo calls him "the last roar issued by the Lion of St. Mark on the sea", while for Samuele Romanin he might have been able to "shake [the Republic] from the disastrous abandonment" and "inspire in her the strength and energy" that she sorely lacked in the final years of its existence. For Romanin, Emo was the last of the great military commanders of the Venetian navy, and indeed of the Republic, which "may indeed be said to have herself descended with him into the sepulchre". After him, the Venetian navy would no longer be called upon to fight.

His sudden death also led to rumours that he had been poisoned. Dandolo insisted that this was the case, and identified his deputy Condulmer, ambitious not only to succeed him, but also to conclude a peace treaty with the Barbary states, as the culprit. This has been convincingly disproved by modern historian Alvise Zorzi.

Two submarines of the Royal Italian Navy were named after him.

== Bibliography ==
- Anderson, R. C. (1946). "The Unfortunate Voyage of the San Carlo". The Mariner's Mirror. 32 (1): 50–54. doi:10.1080/00253359.1946.10657418.
- Anderson, R. C. (1952). Naval Wars in the Levant 1559–1853. Princeton: Princeton University Press.
- Arbel, Benjamin (2013). "Venice's Maritime Empire in the Early Modern Period". In Dursteler, Eric (ed.). A Companion to Venetian History, 1400–1797. Brill. pp. 125–253. ISBN 978-90-04-25252-3.
- Candiani, Guido (2009). I Vascelli della Serenissima: Guerra, politica e costruzioni navali a Venezia in età moderna, 1650-1720 (in Italian). Venice: Istituto Veneto di Scienze, Lettere ed Arti. ISBN 978-88-95996-20-2.
- Eickhoff, Ekkehard (2008). Venedig, spätes Feuerwerk. Glanz und Untergang der Republik, 1700–1797 [Venice's Late Firework. Splendor and Downfall of the Republic, 1700–1797] (in German) (3rd ed.). Stuttgart: Klett-Cotta. ISBN 978-3-608-94145-6.
- Ercole, Guido (2022). Angelo Emo e Jacopo Nani. I due ammiragli che cercarono di salvare Venezia [Angelo Emo and Jacopo Nani. The Two Admirals Who Tried to Save Venice] (in Italian). Trento: Gruppo Modellistico Trentino. ISBN 978-88-98631-20-9.
- Nani Mocenigo, Mario (1935). Storia della marina veneziana: da Lepanto alla caduta della Repubblica [History of the Venetian Navy: from Lepanto to the Fall of the Republic] (in Italian). Rome: Tipo lit. Ministero della Marina – Uff. Gabinetto.
- Preto, Paolo (1993). "EMO, Angelo". Dizionario Biografico degli Italiani (in Italian). Vol. 42: Dugoni–Enza. Rome: Istituto dell'Enciclopedia Italiana. ISBN 978-88-12-00032-6.
- Moro, Federico (2012). Angelo Emo, eroe o traditore? La rivoluzione fallita dell'ultimo dei veneziani [Angelo Emo, Hero or Traitor? The Failed Revolution of the Last of the Venetians] (in Italian). Venice: Studio Lt2. ISBN 978-88-88028-90-3.
- Sanfelice di Monteforte, Ferdinando (2011). "Angelo Emo, l'ultimo ammiraglio della Serenissima" (PDF). Le armi di San Marco: Atti del Convegno di Venezia e Verona, 29–30 settembre 2011. La potenza militare veneziana dalla Serenissima al Risorgimento (in Italian). Società Italiana di Storia Militare. pp. 111–122.
- von Wurzbach, Constantin (1858). "Angelo Emo" . Biographisches Lexikon des Kaiserthums Oesterreich. Vol. 4. Vienna. pp. 35–38.
- Zampieri, Francesco (2011). "Angelo Emo e la riforma della marina veneziana" (PDF). Le armi di San Marco: Atti del Convegno di Venezia e Verona, 29–30 settembre 2011. La potenza militare veneziana dalla Serenissima al Risorgimento (in Italian). Società Italiana di Storia Militare. pp. 123–154.
