= Carlo Aurelio Widmann =

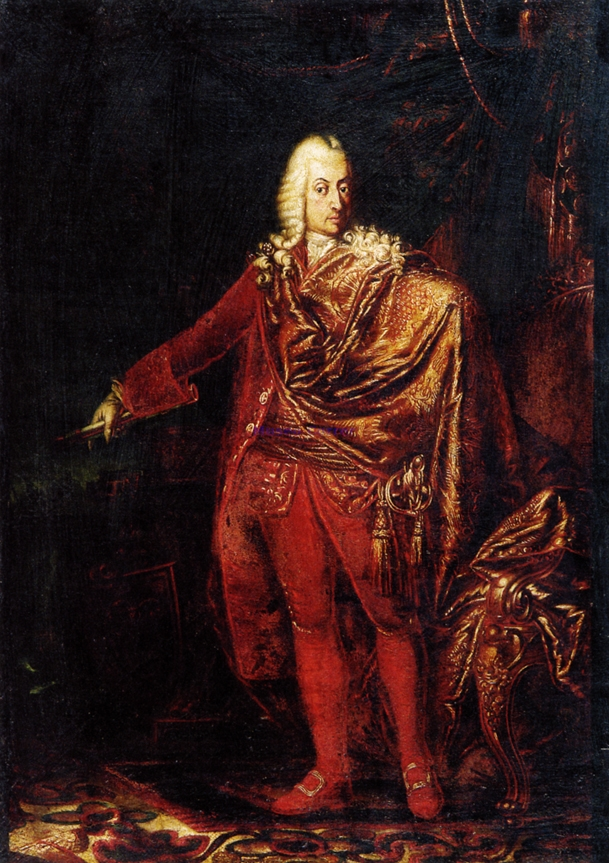
Portrait by Gaetano Grezler

Carlo Aurelio Widmann (Venice, 6 November 1750 – Corfu, 3 January 1798) was a Venetian patrician, naval officer, and the last Provveditore Generale da Mar of the Venetian overseas empire, from 1794 to the Fall of the Republic of Venice in 1797.

== Life ==
Carlo Aurelio Widmann was born on 6 November 1750 at the parish of San Canciano in Venice. His father was Zuane Widmann and his mother was Quintilia Rezzonico, and he had an older brother and two younger ones. The Widmanns were a wealthy merchant family that had been inscribed into the Venetian patriciate in 1646, but its members had not yet risen to the highest offices of the Republic of Venice. In 1758, however, Carlo Aurelio's maternal uncle became Pope Clement XIII, abruptly catapulting the family to power and influence.

Carlo Aurelio's career was the typical cursus honorum for a Venetian patrician, with naval postings alternating with administrative positions in Venice. He began his naval career as a nobile (gentleman cadet) in 1768, becoming captain of a ship of the line (governatore di nave) in 1771 and rear admiral (patrona delle navi) in the next year, and finally admiral (capitano delle navi) in 1783. He also served as superintendent (provveditore) of the Venetian Arsenal in 1791, and as inquisitor of the same two years later. In between, he held civilian posts as one of the superintendents of the banks (provveditori sopra Banchi) in 1775, superintendent on luxury (provveditore alle pompe) in 1783, censor in 1786, and a membership in the board of the cinque savi alla mercanzia in 1792.

The climax of his career was his appointment to the highest joint civil and military office of provveditore generale da mar in 1794. The citizens of Corfu, who had suffered under the financial exactions of his predecessor, welcomed him with enormous enthusiasm. Nevertheless, the situation on the Venetian Ionian Islands was so dismal that Widmann not only had to expend his own treasure to cover the needs of the administration, but had to petition the citizenry for funds as well, to which they responded with considerable generosity. He held the post until the Fall of the Republic of Venice in 1797, and the French occupation of the Ionian Islands in July of that year.

== Works by Widmann ==
- Trattato sulla mattadura della navi.
- La fortificazione universale tanto terrestre che marittima, 1768.
- La nave ben manovrata, ossia, Trattato di manovra, 1773. Republished in 1995, edited by Alvise Chiggiato
- Nuova teoria dell'arboratura delle navi.
- In Nome della Sovranità del Popolo: la Municipalità provvisoria di Venezia: Data 12. Fruttifero (29. Agosto 1797), Pinelli, Zatta, e Pasquali, Stampatori del Governo, Venice, 1797.
- Discorso apologetico scritto dal nobil uomo s. co. Carlo Aurelio Widmann provveditore generale da mar nell'isole del Veneto levante con l'aggiunta di alcune illustrazioni e documenti relativi, Venice, 1799.

== Sources ==
- Dandolo, Girolamo (1855). La caduta della Repubblica di Venezia e i suoi ultimi cinquant'anni. Venice: Co' tipi di Pietro Naratovich.
- Donolo, Luigi (2012). Il Mediterraneo nell'Età delle rivoluzioni 1789-1849. Pisa: Pisa University Press. ISBN 978-88-6741-004-0.
- Crotta, Francesco Calbo (1798). Memoria che può servire alla storia politica degli ultimi otto anni della Repubblica di Venezia. London: F. Rivington.
- Levi, Cesare Augusto (1896). Navi da guerra costruite nell'Arsenale di Venezia dal 1664 al 1896. Venice: Stabilimento Tipografico Fratelli Visentini.
- Miller, William (1903). "The Ionian Islands under Venetian Rule". The English Historical Review. 18 (70): 209–239. doi:10.1093/ehr/XVIII.LXX.209. JSTOR 549461.
- Rösch Widmann, Eva S. (1980). I Widmann. Le vicende di una famiglia veneziana dal Cinquecento all'Ottocento (PDF). Venice: Centro di Studi Veneziani.
- Widmann, Carlo Aurelio; Chiggiato, Alvise (1995). La nave ben manovrata, ossia, Trattato di manovra. Venice: La Malcontenta. OCLC 46795739.
- Widmann, Carlo Aurelio; Paladini, Filippo Maria (1997). Carlo Aurelio Widmann, Provveditore Generale da Mar, Dispacci da Corfù (1794–1797). Venice: La Malcontenta. OCLC 434350547.
