= Alvise Foscari =

Venetian nobleman and naval officer (1724–1783)

Alvise Foscari (Venice, 3 August 1724 – Cephalonia, 27/28 December 1783) was a Venetian nobleman, naval officer, and administrator.

== Life ==
Alvise Foscari was born on 3 August 1724 as the third son of Alvise Foscari and Marta Dal Poggio. From his father, he belonged to the San Simeon Piccolo branch of the Foscari, one of the most distinguished families of the Venetian patriciate, while his mother was not of noble birth, but came from a burgher family. The family wealth having much declined, Alvise chose to follow a career in the Venetian navy, entering service on 4 May 1743 as a gentleman cadet (nobile di nave). The War of the Austrian Succession (1740–1748) was raging at the time, and while the Republic of Venice was neutral in the conflict, the Republic maintained a galley fleet that patrolled the Adriatic Sea. This was Foscari's first posting, and it was in this service that, on 13 December 1747, he received promotion to captain of a ship (governatore di nave).

After the end of the war and the ensuing demobilization, he served in various shore duties, including in the Arsenal of Venice (24 June 1753 – 23 February 1756), but also in non-naval posts such as a directorship in the Banco del Giro (6 October 1756 – 5 January 1757). With the outbreak of the Seven Years' War (1756–1763), he resumed his naval career, being appointed to senior command as Patron delle Navi (rear admiral of the sailing fleet) on 17 May 1759, then Almirante (vice admiral of the sailing fleet) on 28 April 1762, and finally Capitano delle Navi (admiral of the sailing fleet) on 13 April 1765. The end of the war, as well as the conclusion of truces with the Barbary States that reduced the threat of piracy against Venetian shipping, allowed him to return to civilian duties, serving in the Great Council of Venice. He occupied the post of supervisor of deposits (Conservatore del Deposito) from 2 December 1773 to 30 August 1775, and was one of the magistrates supervising public morals known as the Esecutori contro la Bestemmia (31 August 1775 – 30 August 1776).

On 3 August 1776, he was elected governor-general (provveditore generale) of Dalmatia and Venetian Albania, a post which he occupied from September 1777 to October 1780. His tenure was marked by a plague outbreak and drought-induced famine, and in his summary report to the Venetian Senate, he denounced the policy followed by the Republic in these provinces as ineffectual, proposing instead to grant possession of estates to the Morlacchi.

Despite the problems in Dalmatia, on 19 January 1782, he was elected to the Republic's highest military and administrative overseas post, that of Provveditore Generale da Mar, with a seat at Corfu. He began his tenure in September of the same year. He again faced natural disasters, with the devastating earthquakes that hit Santa Maura (Lefkada) in February and June 1783. He died of an illness while at Argostoli, Cephalonia, on 27/28 December 1783.

== Sources ==
- Gullino, Giuseppe (1997). "FOSCARI, Alvise". Dizionario Biografico degli Italiani (in Italian). Vol. 49: Forino–Francesco da Serino. Rome: Istituto dell'Enciclopedia Italiana. ISBN 978-88-12-00032-6.
