= Erizzo =

Erizzo is an Italian surname. Notable people with the surname include:

- Francesco Erizzo (1566–1646), 98th Doge of Venice
- Nicolò Erizzo (1722–1806), Venetian patrician, diplomat and administrator

== See also ==
- Palazzo Erizzo (disambiguation)
- Rizzo (surname)
