= Provveditore Generale da Mar =

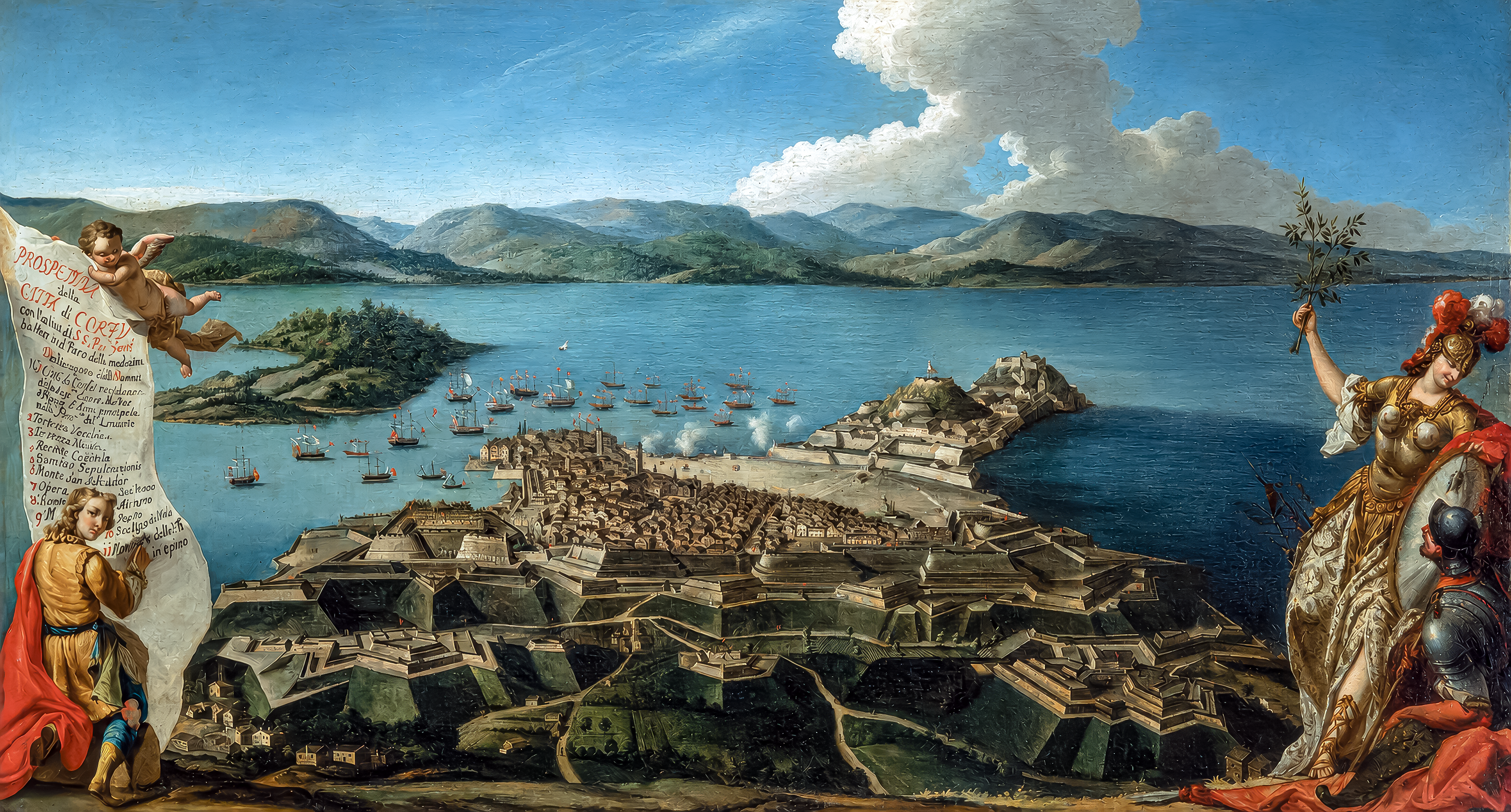
Arrival of a new Provveditore Generale da Mar at Corfu in the 18th century

The Provveditore Generale da Mar (lit. 'Superintendent General of the Sea') was the most senior peacetime office in the Venetian navy and in charge of governing the Venetian overseas empire.

== History and functions ==
The Provveditore Generale da Mar was the supreme commander of the Venetian fleet in peacetime. In wartime, he was replaced by the Capitano Generale da Mar, with more ample powers. The office usually had a tenure of three years, but in wartime, the nomination of a new Capitano Generale da Mar was usually accompanied also by the election of a new Provveditore Generale. From the first half of the 16th century, he also appears as the governor of the Venetian Ionian Islands. Eventually this appointment became regularized, as the Provveditore Generale del Levante; with his seat at Corfu, the Provveditore Generale da Mar was the senior civil and military governor of the Ionian Islands in peacetime.

Typically he hoisted his ensign on a bastard galley, although in later times he was allowed to use a sailing ship of the line instead. As a sign of his command, the poop deck of his vessel bore three lanterns.

In wartime, due to his absence at the head of the fleet, he was sometimes replaced by a Provveditore Generale delle Tre Isole (lit. 'Superintendent general of the Three Islands'), referring to Corfu, Cephalonia, and Zakynthos, renamed to Provveditore Generale delle Quattro Isole after the addition of Lefkada to the Venetian domains in 1684.

The office was abolished after the Fall of the Republic of Venice and the start of French rule in the Ionian Islands in June 1797.

== Catalogue of Provveditori Generali da Mar ==
The following held the post of Provveditore Generale da Mar from 1684 till 1797.

- Girolamo Corner, 1682–1684
- Giacomo Corner, 1684-1687
- Andrea Navagier, 1687-1689
- Girolamo Corner, 1689–1690
- Vicenzo Vendramin, 1690-1693
- Antonio Molin, 1693-1696
- Bortolo Contarini, 1696-1701
- Francesco Grimani, 1701-1704
- Francesco Grimani, 1705-1708
- Alvise III Sebastiano Mocenigo, 1708-1711
- Agostin Sagredo, 1711-1714
- Daniele IV Dolfin, 1714-1715
- Andrea Pisani, 1715-1718
- Antonio Loredan, 1716-1718
- Zorzi Pasqualigo, 1718-1721
- Andrea Corner, 1721-1724
- Francesco Corner, 1724-1728
- Marcantonio Diedo, 1728-1731
- Nicolò Erizzo, 1731-1734
- Pietro Vendramin, 1734-1737
- Zorzi Grimani, 1737-1740
- Antonio Loredan, 1740-1743
- Daniele IX Dolfin, 1743-1746
- Antonio Marin Cavalli, 1746-1749
- Giovanni Battista Vitturi, 1749-1752
- Agostin Sagredo, 1752-1755
- Gerolamo Querini, 1755-1758
- Francesco Grimani, 1758-1761
- Alvise III Contarini, 1761-1764
- Antonio Marin Priuli, 1764-1767
- Andrea Donà, 1767-1770
- Pietro Querini, 1770-1773
- Antonio Renier, 1773-1776
- Giacomo Nani, 1776-1779
- Giacomo Gradenigo, 1779-1782
- Alvise Foscari, 1782-1783
- Nicolò Erizzo, 1784-1786
- Francesco Falier, 1787-1791
- Angelo IV Memmo, 1791-1794
- Carlo Aurelio Widmann, 1794-1797

== Gallery ==
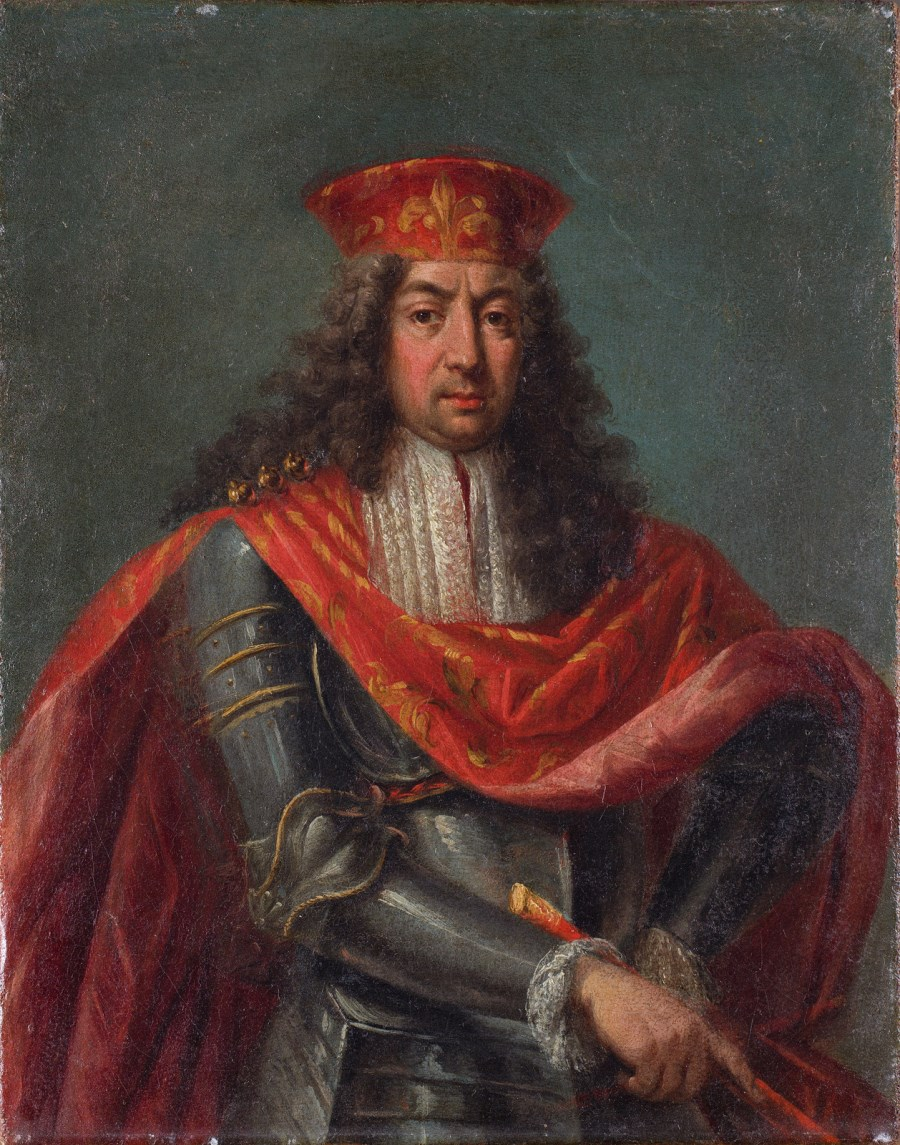
Giorgio Grimani (1687-1750), Provveditore Generale da Mar (1737-1740)

Girolamo Querini, Provveditore Generale da Mar (1755-1758)

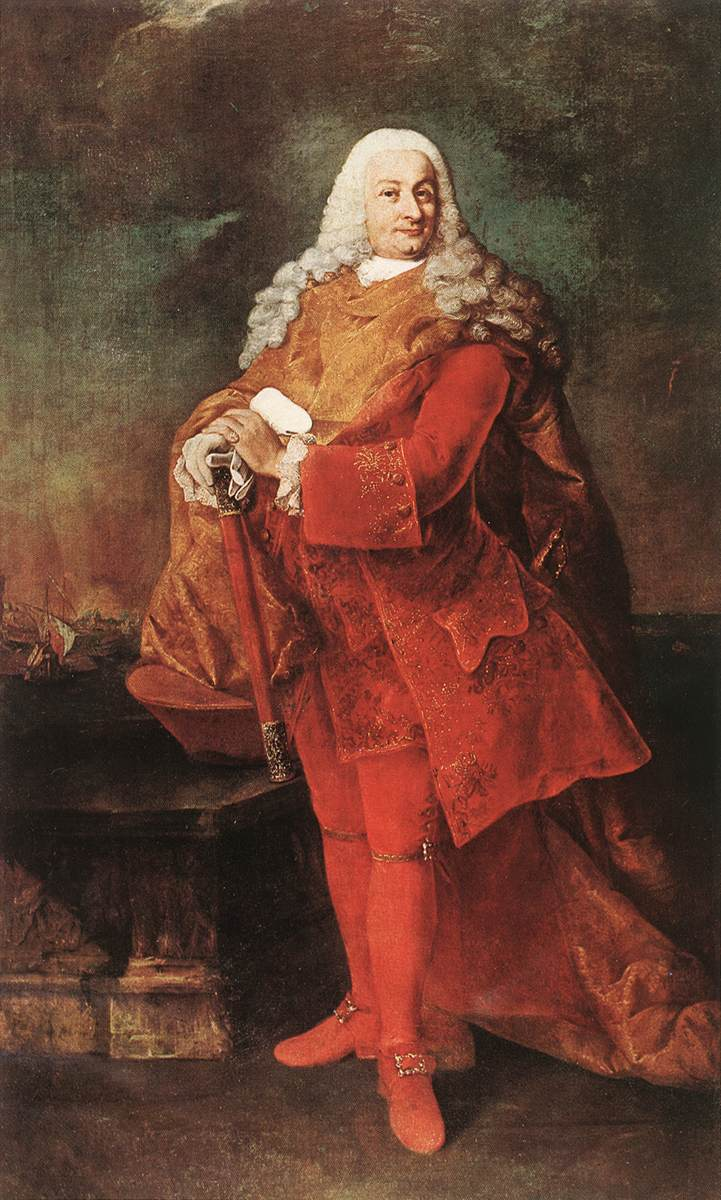
Antonio Renier, Provveditore Generale da Mar (1773-1776), brother of the doge Paolo Renier

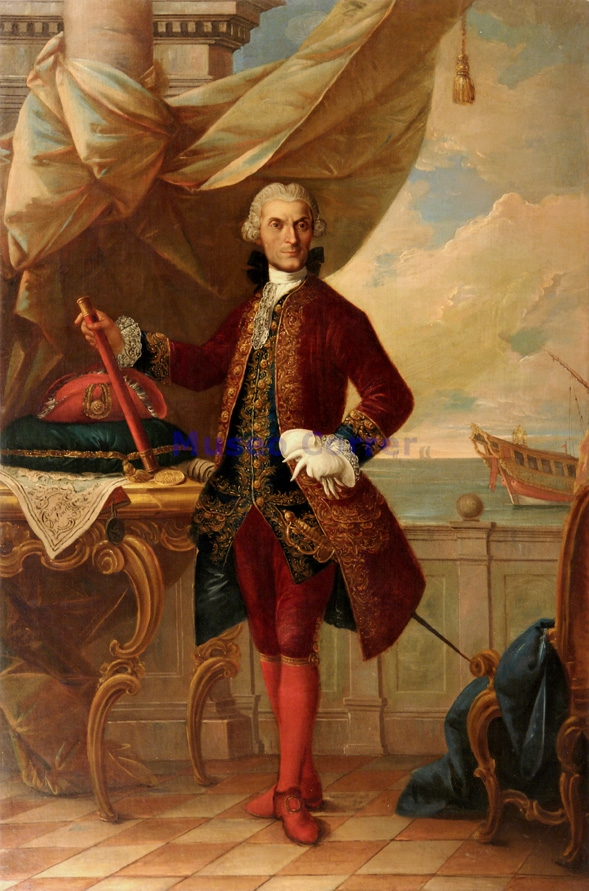
Giacomo Gradenigo (1721-1796), Provveditore Generale da Mar (1779-1782)

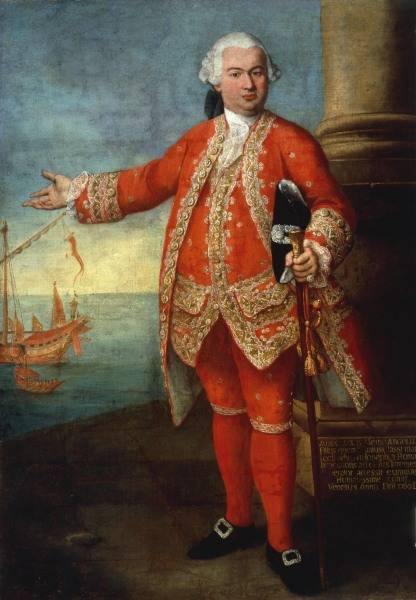
Angelo IV Memmo, Provveditore Generale da Mar (1791-1794)

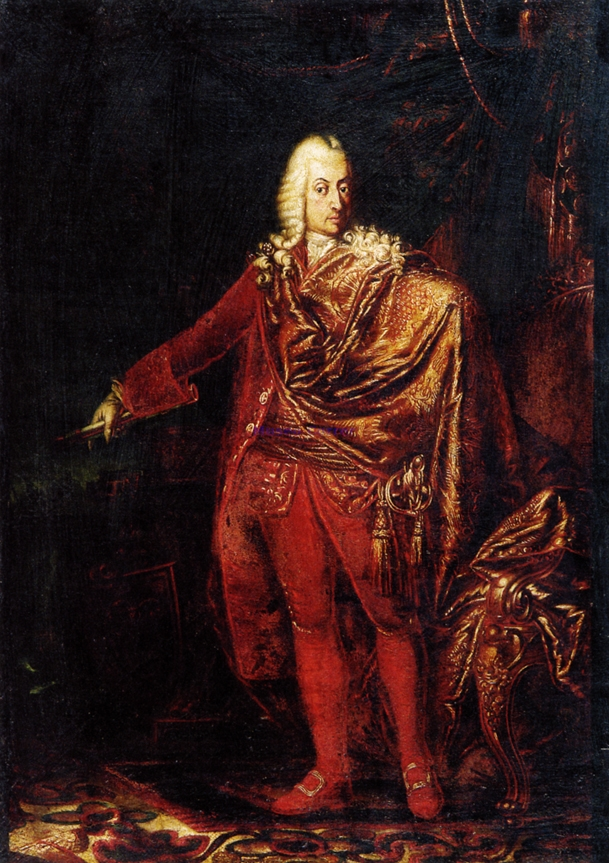
Carlo Aurelio Widmann, last Provveditore Generale da Mar (1794-1797)

== Sources ==
- Arbel, Benjamin (2013). "Venice's Maritime Empire in the Early Modern Period". A Companion to Venetian History, 1400–1797. BRILL. pp. 125–253. ISBN 978-90-04-25252-3.
- Da Mosto, Andrea (1940). L'Archivio di Stato di Venezia. Indice Generale, Storico, Descrittivo ed Analitico. Tomo II: Archivi dell'Amministrazione Provinciale della Repubblica Veneta, archivi delle rappresentanze diplomatiche e consolari, archivi dei governi succeduti alla Repubblica Veneta, archivi degli istituti religiosi e archivi minori (PDF) (in Italian). Rome: Biblioteca d'arte editrice. OCLC 889222113. Archived from the original (PDF) on 2016-03-04.
- Nani Mocenigo, Mario (1935). Storia della marina veneziana: da Lepanto alla caduta della Repubblica [History of the Venetian navy: from Lepanto to the fall of the Republic] (in Italian). Rome: Tipo lit. Ministero della Marina - Uff. Gabinetto.
- Papakosta, Christina (2018). Το αρχείο των βενετών προβλεπτών της Πρέβεζας. Διοίκηση και οργάνωση της πόλης τον 18ο αιώνα [The Archive of the Venetian Provveditori of Preveza; The City's Αdministration and Organization in the 18th century] (in Greek). Preveza: Regional Unit of Preveza. ISBN 978-960-89533-1-4.
