= Nicolò Erizzo =

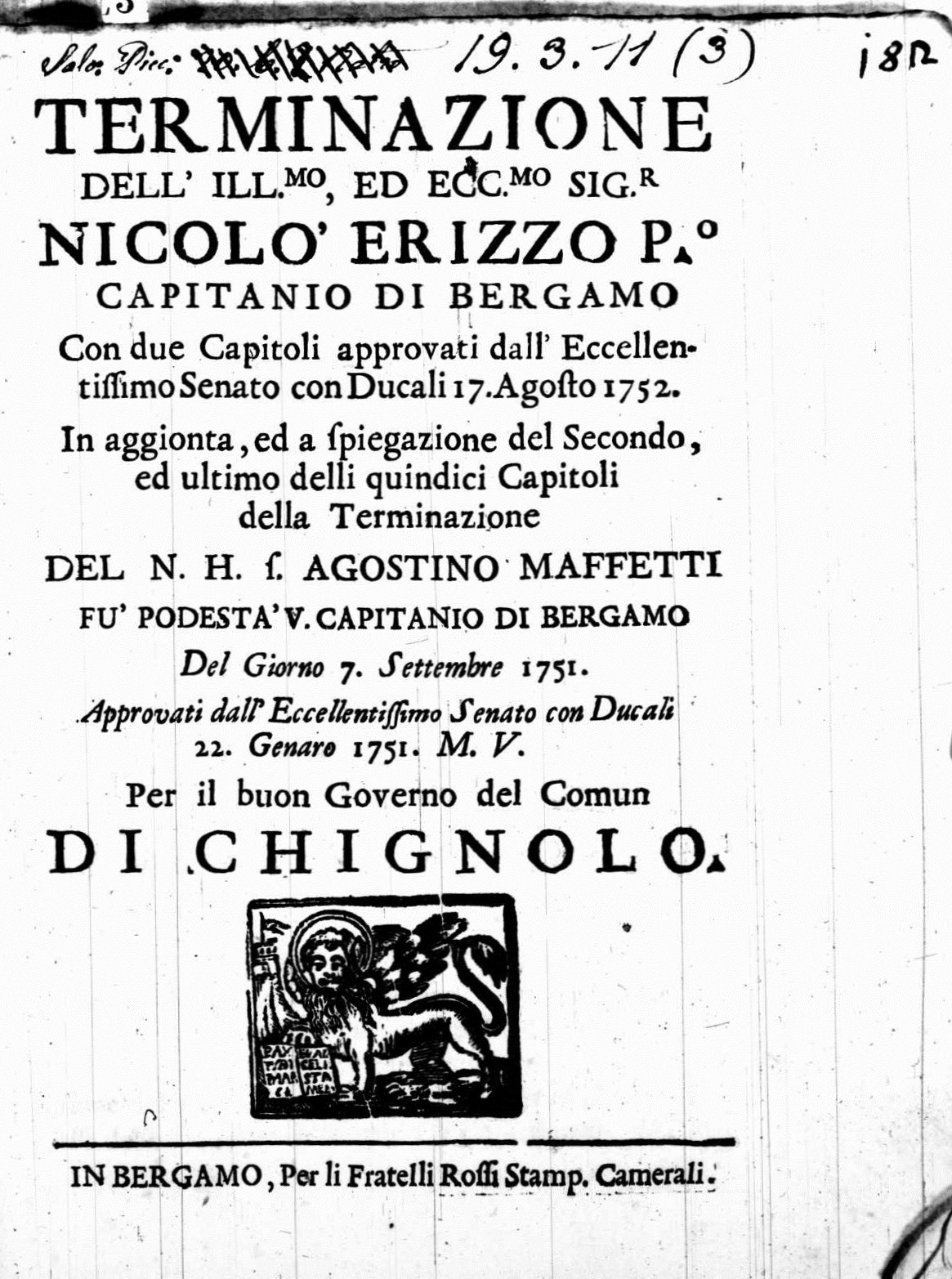
Treatise published in 1752 by Nicolò Erizzo on the administration of Chignolo d'Isola

Nicolò Erizzo (15 January 1722 – 4 February 1806) was a Venetian patrician who served the Republic of Venice as a diplomat and administrator during the last decades of its existence.

== Life ==
Nicolò Erizzo was born in Venice on 15 January 1722 as the firstborn son of Andrea Erizzo and Caterina Grimani. His father was a prominent Venetian statesman and diplomat, and in his youth Nicolò joined him in his sojourns in various European courts. Alongside a first-hand experience of politics and the power brokers of the time, Nicolò received an excellent education. In January 1743 he married Fontana Zorzi, the last descendant of her branch of the House of Zorzi. The marriage remained childless.

Erizzo began his political career in 1748, with election as Savio agli Ordini, followed by a stint as Uffiziale alle Cazude (officials on tax arrears) until 1750, and Captain and Vice-Podestà of Bergamo in 1752–1754. In 1756 he was sent as ambassador to Paris, his arrival coinciding almost with the outbreak of the Seven Years' War. His mission was further hampered by the sudden death of his predecessor, Giovanni Alvise Mocenigo, before he could bring Erizzo up to speed. His four years as ambassador were unremarkable, being almost exclusively focused on observing and reporting on the course of the war.

At the end of his tenure, Erizzo was knighted by King Louis XV, and briefly returned to Venice before taking up his next post, as ambassador to the Habsburg court Vienna, in June 1761. The early part of his tenure there was still marked by the ongoing war, but in 1762, Erizzo held discussions with the Russian envoy Dmitri Alekseyevich Golitsyn on a trade agreement; however, because Venice feared the reactions of Austria and the Ottomans, it refused to commit itself to any concrete decisions. In November 1765 he left Vienna to take up the post of ambassador to the Holy See, where he stayed for little more than a year. This was an important assignment, in view of the jurisdictional conflict between the Republic of Venice and the Papacy over Church administration and property. Erizzo zealously defended the Republic's actions, though not without a personal interest: with the Expulsion of the Jesuits from Venetian territory and the suppression of monasteries, Erizzo was able to acquire much of the confiscated monastic properties.

Elected as Procurator of Saint Mark on 22 February 1767, Erizzo left Rome, being succeeded by his younger brother, Marcantonio. He then held a succession of not very senior administrative offices, but refused to undertake further diplomatic duties, such as proposed embassies to Naples in 1768 and Paris in 1774. He also refused election as Savio del Consiglio, in order to promote the career of his nephew, Andrea. Erizzo himself served as regolatore alla Scrittura (1768–69), provveditore sopra i Feudi (1770–71), sopraprovveditore alle Legne (1771), provveditore agli Ori e monete (1772–73), esecutore contro la Bestemmia (1774), sopraprovveditore alla Giustizia Nuova (1776–77), provveditore sopra gli Ogli (1777–79), inquisitore sopra i Dazi (1779–82 and 1786–88), inquisitore all'Arsenale (1783–84), inquisitore sopra l'esazione dei Pubblici Crediti (1789–92), adjunct inquisitore sopra Ori e monete (1792–94), and deputato alla provvision del Denaro (1797). His attempt to be elected Doge of Venice in 1789 failed, as Ludovico Manin was chosen instead.

A noted lover of luxury, he built a splendid villa at Mestre, where he hosted Pope Pius VI in 1782, and lavishly equipped a bissona on the occasion of Emperor Joseph II's visit in 1775. Although a typical exponent of the Ancien Regime, Erizzo showed some liberal tendencies during his later years: in 1784 he became a member of the Accademia di Scienze Lettere e Arti of Padua, and entered a masonic lodge in the next year. He was also not averse to associate with Jews, and supported their full legal emancipation.

After the Fall of the Republic of Venice in 1797, Erizzo withdrew from public life and died at his palace on 4 February 1806.

== Sources ==
- Gullino, Giuseppe (1993). "ERIZZO, Nicolò". Dizionario Biografico degli Italiani (in Italian). Vol. 43: Enzo–Fabrizi. Rome: Istituto dell'Enciclopedia Italiana. ISBN 978-88-12-00032-6.
