= Italian ship Angelo Emo =

Angelo Emo or simply Emo was the name of at least two ships of the Italian Navy named in honour of Angelo Emo and may refer to:

- Italian submarine Angelo Emo, a Micca-class submarine launched in 1919 and discarded in 1930.
- Italian submarine Emo, a Marcello-class submarine launched in 1938 and sunk in 1942.
