= Palazzo Erizzo =

Palazzo Erizzo may refer to several palaces in Venice, Italy:

- Palazzo Erizzo Nani Mocenigo
- Palazzo Erizzo alla Maddalena
- Palazzo Erizzo a San Martino
- Palazzo Bollani Erizzo

== See also ==
- Erizzo
