= Venetian ship San Vincenzo =

San Vincenzo was a large frigate (fregata grossa) or second-rank ship of the line of the Venetian navy. Ordered in 1720 and laid down in 1722 at the Arsenal of Venice, it belonged to the Sant'Andrea class. It entered service in 1730, and was lost due to fire while undergoing repairs at the anchorage at Govino Bay in Corfu, on the night of 11 May 1752. With about 1,500 tons in total displacement, it could be equipped either as a large frigate (with 20 × 30-pounder and 20 × 14-pounder guns) or as a second-rank ship of the line (with 24 × 30-pounder, 24 × 14-pounder, and 8 × 12-pounder guns).

== Sources ==
- Ercole, Guido (2011). Vascelli e fregate della Serenissima: Navi di linea della Marina veneziana 1652-1797 [Ships of the Line and Frigates of the Serenissima: Ships of the Line in the Venetian Navy 1652-1797] (in Italian). Trento: Gruppo Modellistico Trentino. ISBN 978-88-90565-14-4.
- Ercole, Guido (2022). Angelo Emo e Jacopo Nani. I due ammiragli che cercarono di salvare Venezia [Angelo Emo and Jacopo Nani. The Two Admirals Who Tried to Save Venice] (in Italian). Trento: Gruppo Modellistico Trentino. ISBN 978-88-98631-20-9.
