= Alvise Zorzi =

Italian writer

Alvise Zorzi (10 June 1922 – 14 May 2016) was an Italian journalist and writer from the city of Venice.

He was the son of Elio Zorzi, a journalist and the director of the Mostra Internazionale d'Arte Cinematografica of the Biennale di Venezia in the years immediately following World War II. He was the director of cultural programs for RAI, Italy's state television network and was a member of the UNESCO committee for Venice.

Zorzi authored a number of books on the history and civilization of Venice, including biographies of Carlo Goldoni, Marco Polo, Titian and prominent denizens of the city. Some have been translated in other languages, including English and French.

The final book he published during his lifetime is Napoleon in Venice (Napoleone a Venezia), which went into print in 2010.

== Sources ==
- Short biography at an Italian website (in Italian)
