= Francesco Pesaro =

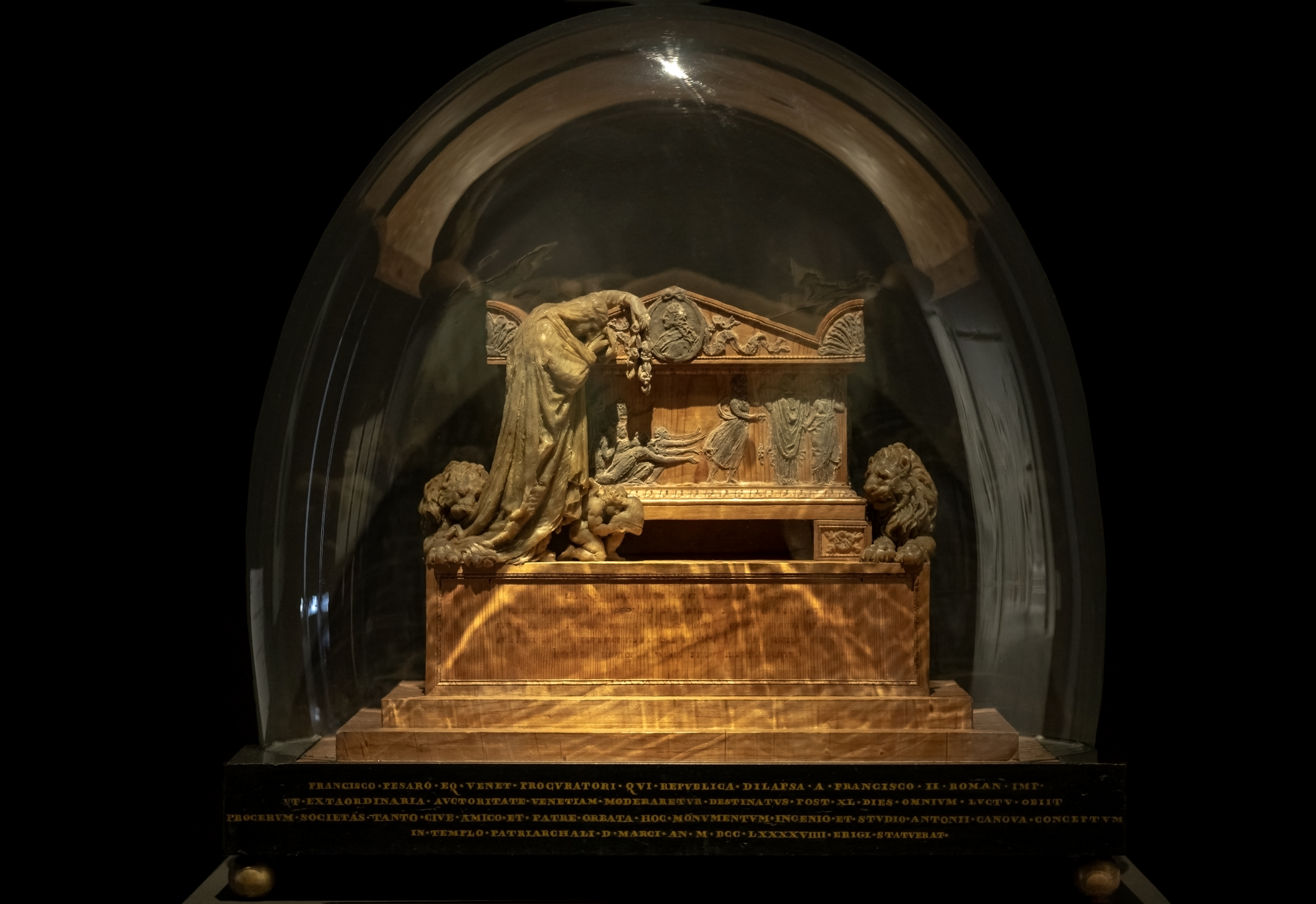
Funerary monument to Francesco Pesaro, by Antonio Canova, now in the Museo Correr

Francesco Pesaro (4 January 1740 – 25 March 1799) was a reformist politician active during the last decades of the Republic of Venice. He served as ambassador to the Kingdom of Spain, and was elected as Procurator of Saint Mark in 1781.

== Sources ==
- Eickhoff, Ekkehard (2008). Venedig, spätes Feuerwerk. Glanz und Untergang der Republik, 1700–1797 [Venice's Late Firework. Splendor and Downfall of the Republic, 1700–1797] (in German) (3rd ed.). Stuttgart: Klett-Cotta. ISBN 978-3-608-94145-6.
- Gullino, Giuseppe (2015). "PESARO, Francesco". Dizionario Biografico degli Italiani (in Italian). Vol. 82: Pazzi–Pia. Rome: Istituto dell'Enciclopedia Italiana. ISBN 978-88-12-00032-6.
