= Zaccaria Betti =

Italian poet

Zaccaria Betti (7 July 1732-1788) was a Venetian poet, writing about agricultural topics.

Born in Verona, he began studying under the Jesuits in Brescia, but illness forced him to finish his studies in Verona. His main poem was del Baco da Seta, canti 4, con annotazione (dedicated to Marchese Giambattista Spolverini, 1736), mimicking the work Sereide by Emanuele Tesauro. Betti's second work was a poem titled la Cascina. He was an honorary member of the Accademia dei Georgofili of Florence.
