= Uffiziali alle Cazude =

Magistrates of the Republic of Venice

The Uffiziali alle Cazude (lit. 'officials on the tax arrears') were fiscal magistrates of the Republic of Venice, charged with the collection of tax arrears and other debts owed to the state. They imposed a ten-percent penalty on the sums owed. The magistracy is first attested in 1474, but was certainly older.

== Sources ==
- Chambers, David Sanderson; Fletcher, Jennifer; Pullan, Brian, eds. (2001). Venice: A Documentary History, 1450-1630. University of Toronto Press. ISBN 978-0-802084248.
- Da Mosto, Andrea (1937). L'Archivio di Stato di Venezia. Indice Generale, Storico, Descrittivo ed Analitico. Tomo I: Archivi dell' Amministrazione Centrale della Repubblica Veneta e Archivi Notarili (in Italian). Rome: Biblioteca d'arte editrice. OCLC 772861816. Archived from the original on 2021-11-13.
