= Venetian rule in the Ionian Islands =

1363–1797 overseas possession of Venice

Ionian Islands Ixołe Jonie (Venetian) Ἰόνιοι Νῆσοι (Greek) Iónioi Nísoi (Latin Greek)
- Province of the Republic of Venice
- 1363–1797
- Flag

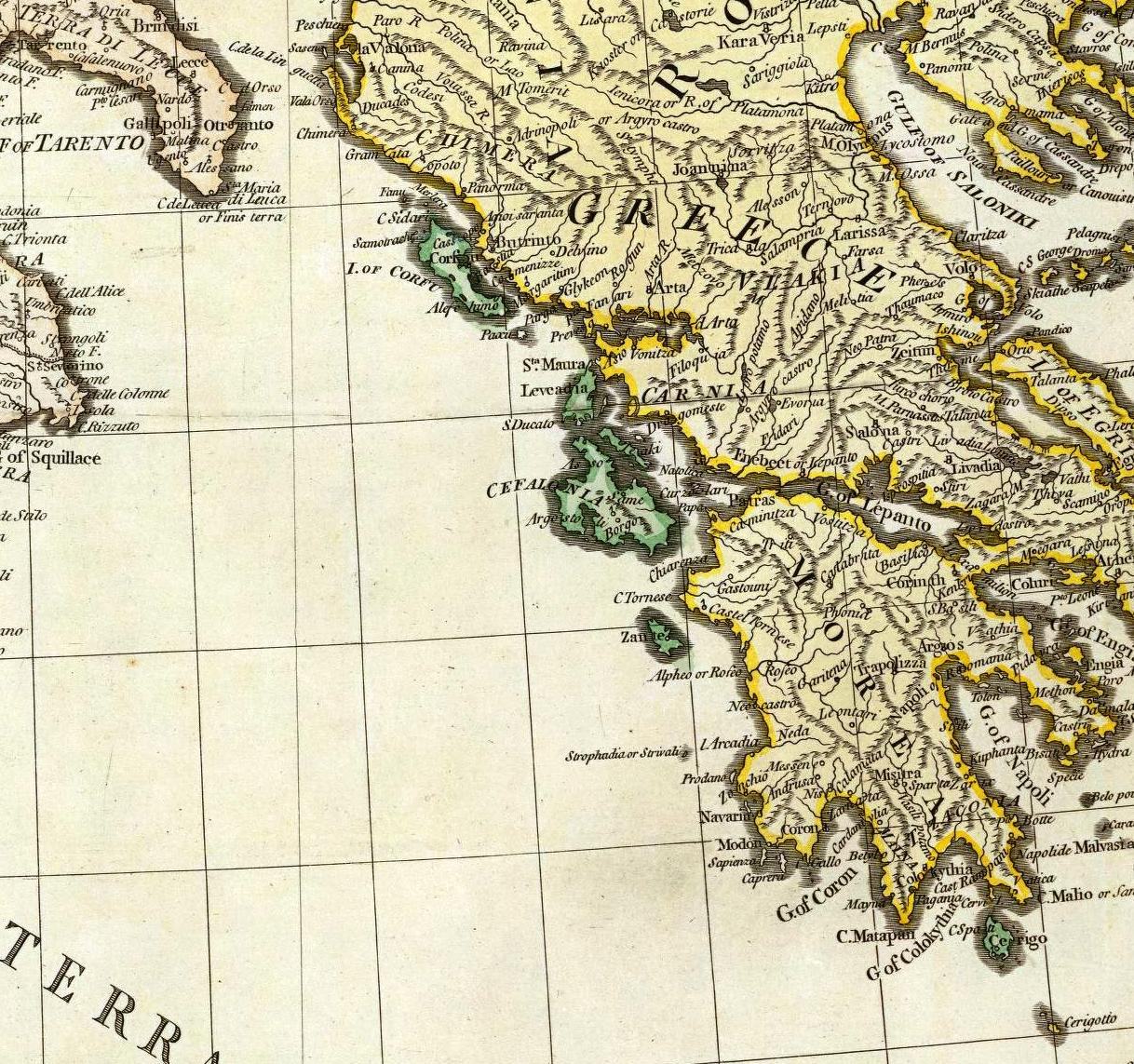
- The Ionian Islands in green. Map of 1785, when the Islands were still part of the Venetian Republic.
- Capital: Corfu
- Historical era: Middle Ages
  - Fourth Crusade: 1202–1204
  - Established^{1}: 1363
  - First Ottoman–Venetian War: 1463–1479
  - Second Ottoman–Venetian War: 1499–1503
  - Treaty of Passarowitz: 1718
  - Invasion of Venice: 1792– 1797
  - Treaty of Campo Formio: 17 October 1797
Preceded by	Succeeded by
County Palatine of Cephalonia and Zakynthos	First period of French rule in the Ionian Islands
- Today part of: Greece
- ^{1} Each island became part of the Venetian empire in different dates. 1363 refers to Cythera and Anticythera.

The Ionian Islands were an overseas possession of the Republic of Venice from the mid-14th century until the late 18th century. The conquest of the islands took place gradually. The first to be acquired was Cythera and the neighboring islet of Anticythera, indirectly in 1238 and directly after 1363. In 1386 the Council of Corfu, which was the governing body of the island, voted to make Corfu a vassal of Venice. During the Venetian period the Council remained the most powerful institution on the island. A century later, Venice captured Zante in 1485, Cephalonia in 1500 and Ithaca in 1503. These three islands modelled their administration on Corfu's model and formed their own councils. The conquest was completed in 1718 with the capture of Lefkada. Each of the islands remained part of the Venetian Stato da Màr until Napoleon Bonaparte dissolved the Republic of Venice in 1797. The Ionian Islands are situated in the Ionian Sea, off the west coast of Greece. Cythera, the southernmost, is just off the southern tip of the Peloponnese and Corfu, the northernmost, is located at the entrance of the Adriatic Sea. It is believed that the Venetian period on the Ionian Islands was generally prosperous, especially compared with the coinciding Tourkokratia — Turkish rule over the remainder of present-day Greece.

The governor of the Ionian Islands during the Venetian period was the Provveditore generale da Mar, who resided on Corfu. Additionally, each island's authorities were divided into the Venetian and the domestic authorities. The economy of the islands was based on exporting local goods, primarily raisins, olive oil and wine, whereas Venetian lira, the currency of Venice, was also the currency of the islands. Some features of the culture of Venice were incorporated in the culture of the Ionian Islands, thus influencing to this day local music, cuisine and language.

== Relations between Venice and Byzantium ==
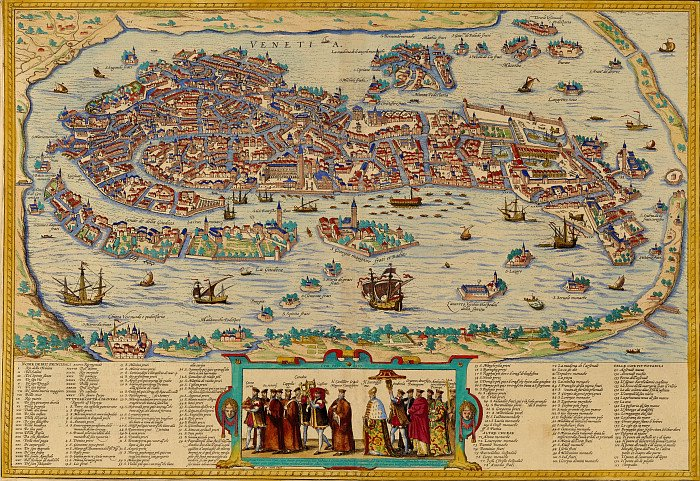
View of Venice in 1565

Venice was founded in 421 after the destruction of nearby communities by the Huns and the Lombards. In the shifting Italian borders of the following centuries, Venice benefited from remaining under the control of the Roman Empire - increasingly as the furthest Northwestern outpost of the now Constantinople centered power. During Justinian I's reconquest of Italy from the Visigoths, Venice was an increasingly important stronghold for the Empire's Exarchate of Ravenna. The political centre of the exarchate, and the most senior military officials of the Empire, were situated in Ravenna. The subordinate military officials who were their representatives in the Venetian lagoons were called tribunes, and only in about AD 697 were the lagoons made a separate military command under a dux (doge). Notwithstanding the election of the first Doge, vassalic evidence such as honours and orders received by the doge from the Emperor implies that Venice was considered part of the Byzantine Empire even after the capture of Ravenna by the Lombards. Despite the Pax Nicephori (803), which recognised Venice as Byzantine territory, the influence of the Eastern Roman Emperor slowly faded away. By 814 Venice functioned as a fully independent republic. Even so, Venice became a partner of the Empire and trading privileges were granted to it by the Emperors via treaties, such as the Byzantine–Venetian Treaty of 1082.

The Fourth Crusade (1202–1204) was initially intended to invade Muslim-controlled areas; instead, the Crusaders attacked the capital of the Byzantine Empire, Constantinople, resulting in the temporary dissolution of the empire and the sack of its capital. As Venice was one of the participants in the Crusade its relations with the Byzantine Empire were strained during this period. Moreover, by styling themselves "Lord of one-quarter and one-eighth of the whole Empire of Romania" after the Crusade, the Doges of Venice contributed to the deterioration of the relations between the two states. Efforts to improve relations, for example through the Nicaean–Venetian Treaty of 1219, proved unsuccessful. A period of friendly relations only followed the Sicilian Vespers in 1282, when Venice, foreseeing the fall of Charles, the French King of Sicily, began forming closer relations with Byzantium. Venice had been bound by an alliance with Charles against Byzantium in 1281.

== Appellation ==
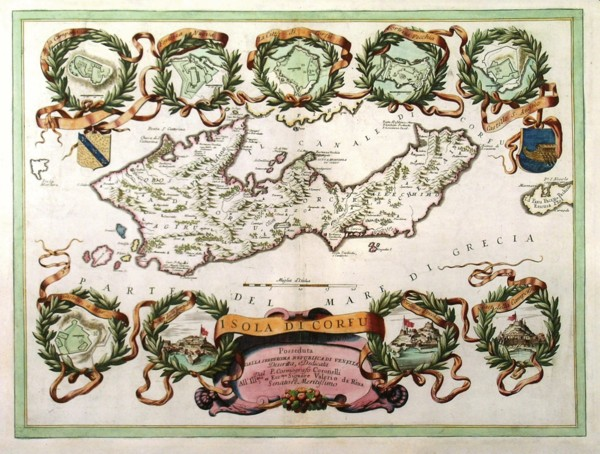
A c. 1690 Venetian map of Isola di Corfu : posseduta dalla Serenissima Republica di Venetia. The map shows the fortresses of Corfu surrounded by wreaths and ribbons. Angelokastro is indicated as "Castello S. Angelo" in a ribbon below the top right wreath of the map.

The Islands were referred to, both individually and collectively, by various names. After Venice captured Cephalonia on 24 December 1500, the administration of the defense of all the islands was delegated to an official seated in Corfu. This official was being referred to as "the General Provveditore of the Three Islands" (Provveditore Generale delle Tre Isole) and resided at the fortress of Angelokastro from 1387 to the end of the 16th century. The Three Islands refer to Corfu, Zante and Cephalonia. The Venetian equivalent for "Ionian Islands" is Ixołe Jonie, the Italian being Isole Ionie and the Greek Ιόνια Νησιά in Modern Greek and Ἰόνιοι Νῆσοι in Katharevousa.

Below are the seven principal islands from north to south, including their Greek and Italian names in parentheses:

- Corfu (Kerkyra; Corfù)
- Paxos (Paxi; Passo)
- Lefkada (Leucas; Santa Maura or Lèucade)
- Cephalonia (Kefal(l)onia or Kefal(l)inia; Cefalonia)
- Ithaca (Ithaki or Thiaki; Itaca, Val di Compare or Piccola Cefalonia)
- Zante (Zakynthos; Zante or Zacinto), see the long account here
- Cythera (Kythira; Cerigo)

Cythera and Lefkada were additionally called Çuha Adası or Çuka Adası and Ayamavra respectively by the Ottomans.

== History ==
=== Roman and Byzantine period ===
During the Roman Empire, the Ionian Islands were variously part of the provinces of Achaea and Epirus vetus. These would form, with the exception of Cythera, the Byzantine theme of Cephallenia in the late 8th century. From the late 11th century, the Ionian Islands became a battleground in the Byzantine–Norman Wars. The island of Corfu was held by the Normans in 1081–1085 and 1147–1149, while the Venetians unsuccessfully besieged it in 1122–1123. The island of Cephalonia was also unsuccessfully besieged in 1085, but was plundered in 1099 by the Pisans and in 1126 by the Venetians. Finally, Corfu and the rest of the theme, except for Lefkada, were captured by the Normans under William II of Sicily in 1185. Although Corfu was recovered by the Byzantines by 1191, the other islands henceforth remained lost to Byzantium, and formed a County palatine of Cephalonia and Zakynthos under William's Greek admiral Margaritus of Brindisi.

Count Palatine Dynasties of Cephalonia and Zakynthos

Arms of the House of Anjou-Durazzo

Arms of the Tocco family, the last rulers of the County

=== The Frankokratia ===
Following the Fourth Crusade and the signature of the Partitio terrarum imperii Romaniae, Corfu came under Venetian rule. In 1207 though, doge Pietro Ziani ceded the island as a feudum to ten Venetian nobles, provided that they demonstrate loyalty and devotion and that they pay taxes. Corfu passed in the hands of the Despotate of Epirus around 1214, and was captured in 1257 by Manfred of Sicily, who put his admiral Philippe Chinard there in charge of his eastern possessions. Nonetheless, with the defeat of Manfred at Benevento and the signature of the Treaty of Viterbo on 27 May 1267, Corfu became a possession of the Angevin Kingdom of Naples. Meanwhile, the rest of the islands continued to form part of the County palatine, which throughout its existence was governed by three families: the Orsini (whose relation to the Roman Orsini family is unattested), the House of Anjou and the Tocco family. The rule of the family of Tocco lasted for 122 years, up until 1479, when Ottomans captured Cephalonia, Zante, Lefkada and Ithaca.

=== The Venetian conquest ===
On 13 February 1386 Corfu became once more a Venetian possession and this time Venetian rule would last until the end of the Republic. This was accomplished voluntarily by the people of Corfu. On 10 May, the Corfiotes appointed five ambassadors to submit to the Venetian senate. The Ottomans made several attempts to capture Corfu, the first of which was in 1537. This attack led Venice to an alliance with the Pope and Emperor Charles V, known as the Holy League, against the Ottoman Empire. Another major unsuccessful Ottoman attack was that of July 1716.

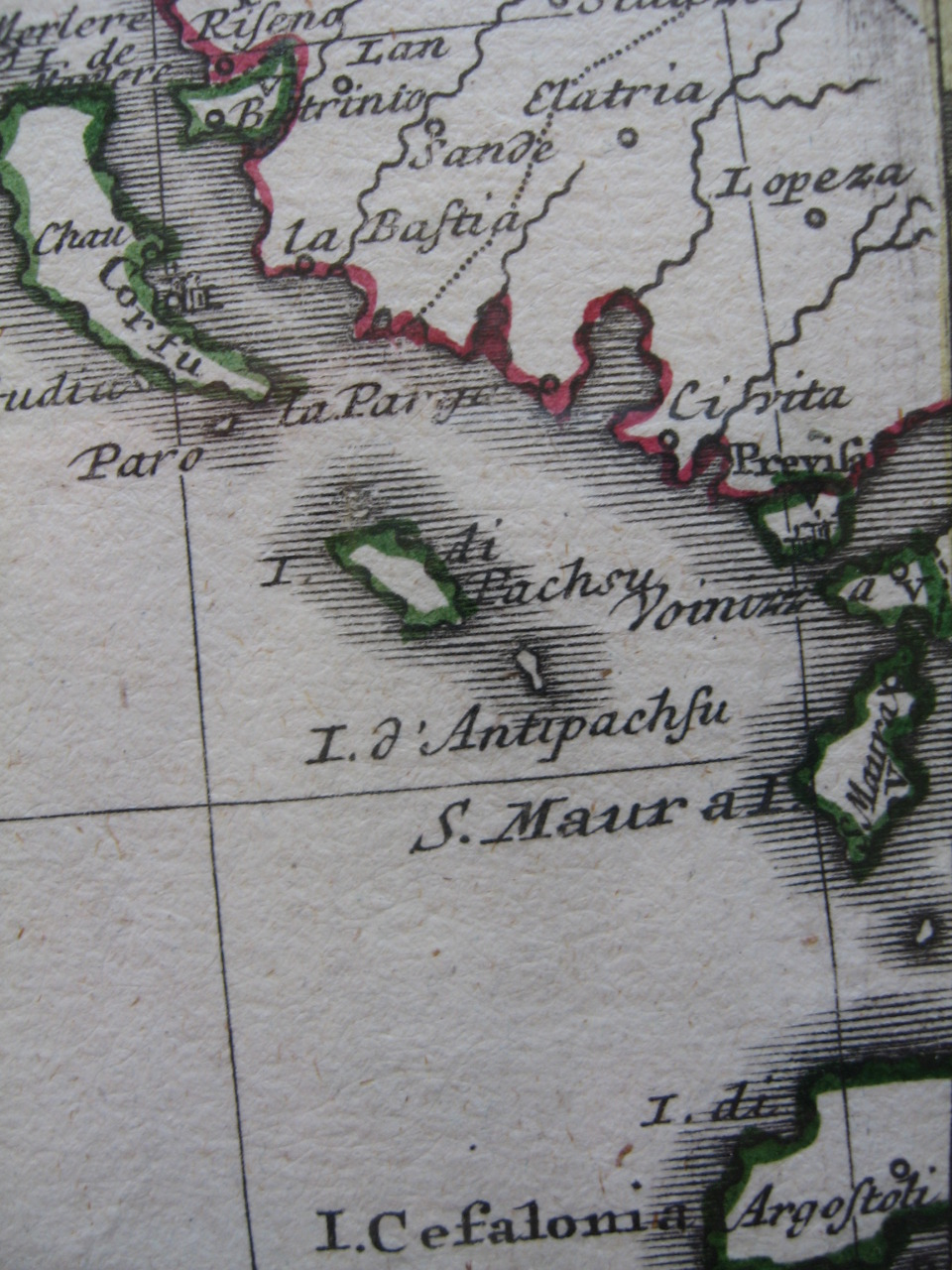
Venetian possessions in the Ionian Sea area

After the partition of the Byzantine Empire in 1204, Cythera fell into Venetian hands in 1238 through the marriage of Marco Venier with the daughter of the Greek lord of the island. Cythera and Anticythera constituted part of the Stato da Màr for the first time in 1363 followed by an interruption of a three-year Turkish rule, between 1715 and 1718. With the Treaty of Passarowitz Cythera and Anticythera passed to the Venetian Republic and remained under its control until its fall, in 1797.

The Turkish rule in the three islands of Cephalonia, Zante and Ithaca was short-lived. In 1481, two years after the beginning of the Turkish rule, Antonio Tocco invaded and briefly occupied Cephalonia and Zante but he was soon driven out by the Venetians. Zante was officially recovered by the Venetians in 1485. Then, Cephalonia, after sixteen years of Turkish occupation (1484–1500), became part of the Stato da Màr on 24 December 1500, with the Siege of the Castle of St. George. Finally, Ithaca, following the fate of Cephalonia, was conquered by Venice in 1503.

Ithaca had become depopulated and rewilded during the period of Turkish rule. In 1504, the Venetians ordered official the repopulation of Ithaca with tax incentives to attract settlers from neighbouring islands. The Venetian authorities found the island was already being repopulated by members of the Galatis family, who laid claim to it as their property, having received rights over Ithaca under the Tocco regime.

However, according to historians, the island received a great population revival in the period before and after the fall of Khandaka (Heraclion) when numerous people from Crete arrived there as well as the noble Karavia family, a branch of the ancient Kallergi family. This family and its followers inhabited settlements on the island, received fiefs from the Venetian Senate and indulged in a tremendously profitable maritime trade as well as piracy against the Ottomans. According to the French traveler Leake during the 18th century the families of Karavia (Latin: Caravia), Petalas and Dendrinos constituted the three main factions of the island, with the Karavia family controlling its most productive part.

Lefkada, part of the Despotate of Epirus since the latter's foundation in 1205, was incorporated by Leonardo I Tocco into the County of Cephalonia in 1362. The Despotate of Epirus was one of the three Byzantine Empires in exile created after the Fourth Crusade in 1204. Following the fate of the other central Ionian Islands, it was captured by the Turks in 1479 and then by the Venetians in 1502. However, Venetian rule did not last, as Lefkada was given back to the Ottoman Empire one year later. Turkish rule over Lefkada lasted for over 200 years, from 1479 to 1684, when Francesco Morosini attacked and subdued the island during the Morean War. Lefkada, however, did not become officially Venetian until 1718, with the signature of the Treaty of Passarowitz.

=== Dissolution of the Republic and aftermath ===
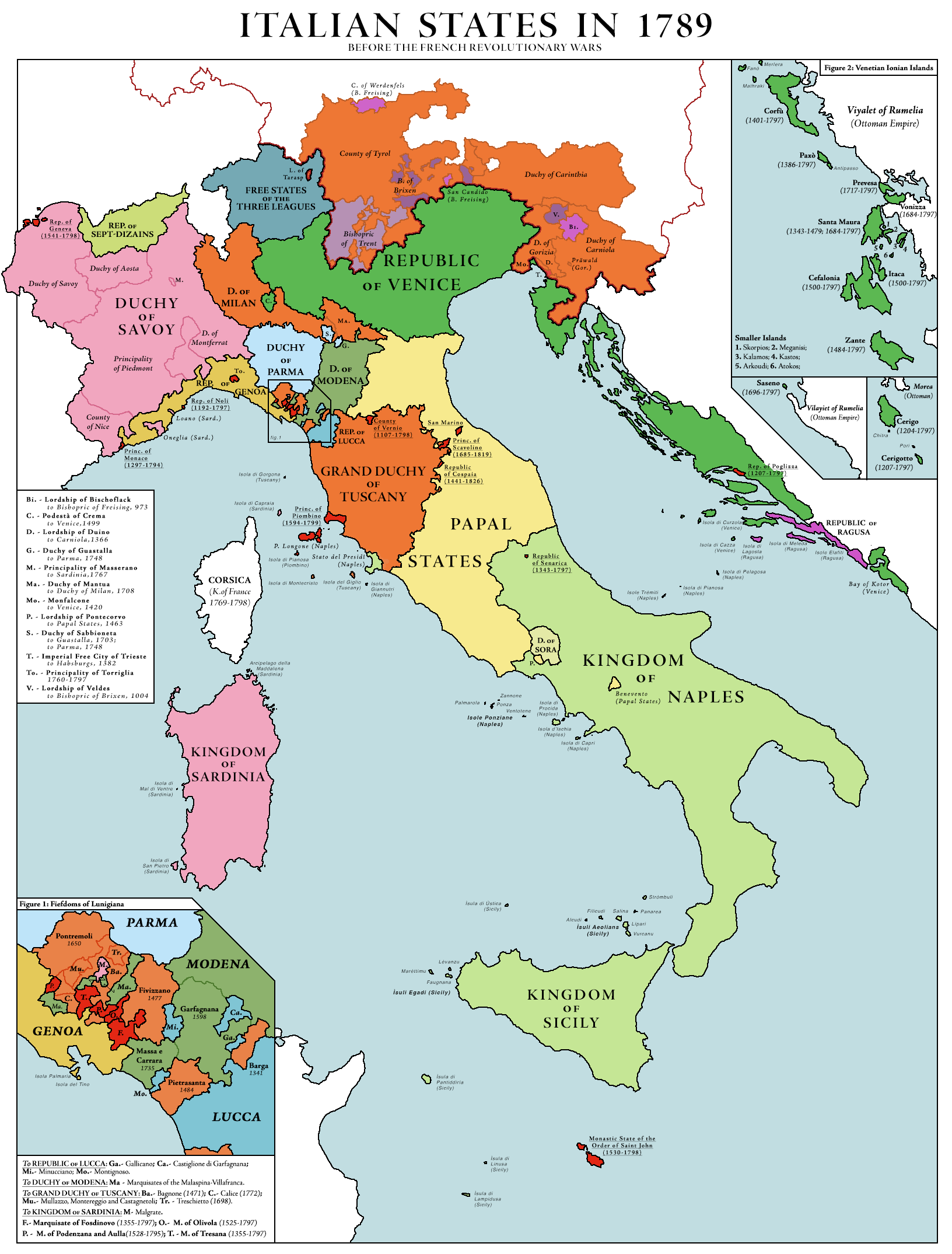
Political map of Italy in the year 1789, showing the Ionian islands of the Republic of Venice in detail

Napoleon Bonaparte declared war against Venice on 3 May 1797. The signing of the Treaty of Campo Formio, on 17 October 1797, marked the dissolution of the Republic of Venice and the sharing of its territories between France and Austria. The lands of the Terraferma up to the River Adige, the city itself and the possessions of the Balkan peninsula of Istria and Dalmatia were yielded to Austria. The Ionian Islands, part of Venetian maritime territories, were ceded to France. Napoleon organized the islands into three departments: Corcyre, Ithaque, and Mer-Égée. The first included the islands of Corfu and Paxos, as well as the former Venetian settlements of Butrint and Parga situated in Epirus. The second department was formed by the islands of Cephalonia, Ithaca and Lefkada and the cities of Preveza and Vonitsa, whereas Zante and Cerigo were part of the third department. The French rule, however, did not last as Russia allied with the Ottoman Empire in September 1798 and in 1799 a Russo-Ottoman naval expedition captured the islands. With the signing of a treaty between Russia and the Porte on 21 March 1800, an independent island republic under the protection of both the empires was established. The name of the new state was agreed to be the "Septinsular Republic" and included all the territories of the three former French departments except for the continental possessions of Parga, Preveza, Vonitsa and Butrint. With the Treaty of Tilsit in 1807, the seven islands were given back to France by Russia. In October 1809, the United Kingdom took possession of all the islands with the exception of Corfu and Paxos, which was only surrendered in 1814. In 1815, the Ionian Islands became a British protectorate under the name United States of the Ionian Islands.

== Administration ==
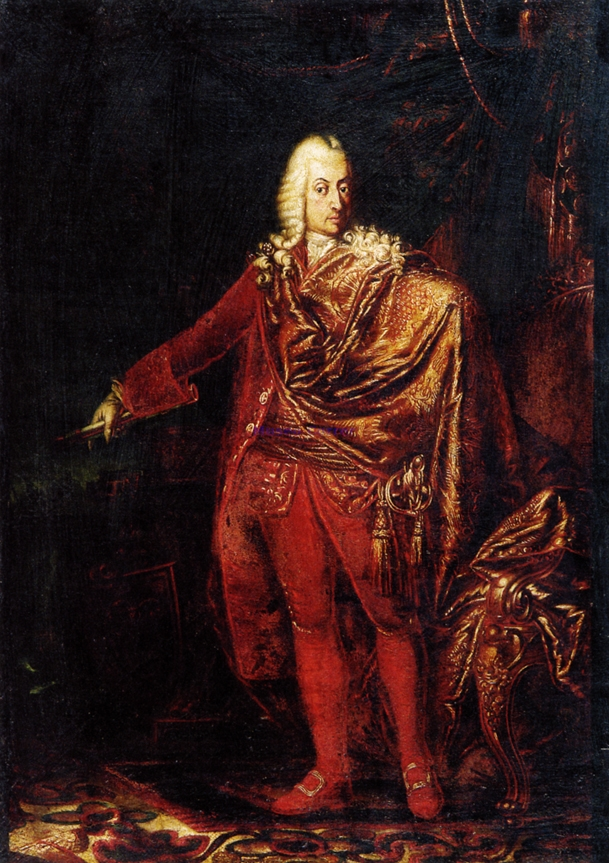
Portrait of Carlo Aurelio Widmann, last Venetian governor of the Ionian islands

The civil and military governor of the Ionian Islands was the Provveditore generale da Mar, who lived on Corfu and had the supreme peacetime command of the Venetian navy. In wartime, due to his absence at the head of the fleet, he was sometimes replaced by a Provveditore generale delle Tre Isole ("Superintendent general of the Three Islands"), referring to Corfu, Zante, and Cephalonia. As a result of the two prolonged wars of the 17th century—the War of Candia (1645–1669) and the Morean War (1684–1699)—the office acquired a more permanent nature, and was renamed to Provveditore generale delle Quattro Isole after the capture of Santa Maura in 1684.

Authorities in the islands were divided into two types: the Venetian ones, occupied by Venetians and represented the sovereign state and its political and military power over the Islands, and the domestic authorities, which were appointed by the Communal Council (Consiglio della Comunità). The Venetians were appointed by the Great Council of Venice. There were three officials constituting the reggimento ("regime") of each island. The head of the reggimento had the title of provveditore in all the islands except for Corfu, where he was called bailo. The title could only be held by a nobleman. The subordinate Venetian officials were the consiglieri, two on each island, who performed administrative and judicial functions along with the provveditore of each island. The provveditore's responsibilities also included security from hostile raids, taxation, religious and other issues.

In Corfu the Venetian officials included a bailo, a provveditore and a capitano, two consiglieri, a capitano della cittadella and a castellano della fortezza. In Cephalonia and Zante there were only one provveditore and two consiglieri. When Lefkada (Santa Maura) was incorporated a Provveditore was appointed, while the archives also record the occasional appointment of a Provveditore straordinario, although, in 1595, another provveditore was appointed to the Fortress of Asso. In Cythera the reggimento included both a provveditore and a castellano. In imitation of the metropolis, the domestic authorities comprised both a Consiglio Maggiore and a Consiglio Minore composed of members of the local aristocracy.

There were ten fortresses throughout the islands, with one on each island serving as its capital. On Corfu, however, there were three fortresses; two in the town of Corfu and the Angelokastro. On Cephalonia there were two, the castle of St. George or the Fortress of Cephalonia (Città di Cefalonia) and the Fortress of Asso (Fortezza d'Asso) in the northern part.

== Economy ==
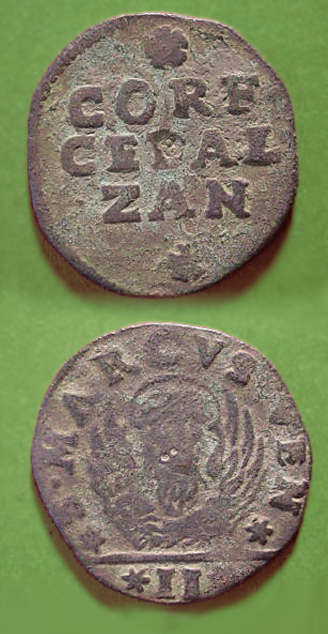
Two-solidi coin minted in the Ionian Islands

The Ionian economy during the Venetian period was largely based on exporting local products. The most important of the agricultural products of Corfu was olive oil. On the islands of Cephalonia and Zante the main exports were raisins, olive oil and wine. One of the most significant exports was olive oil. Groves of olive trees were planted throughout the islands during the Venetian period as olive oil was important to Venice's economy. Although the production of it was successful, the Republic only allowed exportation to Venice. Statistics for the years 1766–70 indicate 1,905,917 olive trees on Corfu, 113,161 on Zante, 38,516 on Cephalonia, 44,146 on Lefkada and 31,884 on Cythera.

Nevertheless, raisin exports were the most important export of the islands during the Venetian rule. By the early 18th century Zante, Cephalonia, and part of Ithaca had become a major centre of the currant trade. Because of the fierce competition in the raisin trade between Venice and the United Kingdom, Venice prohibited the free export of raisins from the islands. Another measure was the nuova imposta, a heavy export tax for foreign ships.

The currency of the islands during Venetian rule was the Venetian lira, as in Venice. There was a special issue for the Islands; the obverse side of it has the complete or shortened inscription CORFU/CEFALONIA/ZANTE in three lines. The reserve depicts the winged and haloed lion of Saint Marc in a front view, holding the book of the Gospel in his fore-paws. The Ionian Islands formed part of the Venetian maritime trade route to the Orient.

== Demographics ==
When the central Ionian Islands were captured by Venice their population was very low and Ithaca was completely uninhabited. To address this problem, a small colonisation to the islands took place. Catholic Italians from Terraferma (later called Corfiot Italians) and Orthodox Greeks from the Stato da Màr were transferred to the islands as part of the colonisation. The phenomenon is well attested for Cephalonia, after whose conquest in 1500 the island was colonized not only by civilian and military (stradioti) refugees from the lost Venetian fortresses of Modon and Coron, but also received an influx of families from the Venetian-ruled island of Crete. The population eventually increased: in 1765–66 it had reached 111,439; in 1780, the population was 150,908. Fourteen years later, there were 155,770 inhabitants throughout the islands.

These are some figures concerning the population of each island during the Venetian period:

Island	1470	1500	1528	1532	1568	1583	1675	1684	1760	1766
Corfu				14,246		19,221	20,000			44,333
Paxos									4,150
Lefkada								9,000	12,000	11,760
Ithaca					300				2,500
Cephalonia		14,000				25,543				21,659
Zante			17,255			14,054	25,000			25,325
Cythera	500								6,000	6,183

=== Language and education ===
During the Venetian period all public acts were drawn up in the Venetian language, the official language of the Government. Greek remained spoken by the peasantry whereas Venetian was adopted by the upper class and it was generally preferred within the towns (like in Corfu city, where nearly all the population spoke the Veneto de Mar). Thus, the Venetian language became, if not the common language of the Ionians, at least the prestigious language. The Venetians did little in the area of education, mainly due to the fact that schooling was not considered a responsibility of the state at that time in Europe but a private matter. Some authors believe that this was done intentionally by Venice, as part of its colonial policy. People belonging to the upper classes were more likely to be educated and to have studied at an Italian university, usually the University of Padua. Modelled after the academies operating at that time in Venice, the first literary academy, Accademia degli Assicurati, was founded in Corfu in 1656 by individuals. It had as an emblem two rocks beneath a winged lion, with an inscription His Semper hovering in the air.

=== Religion ===
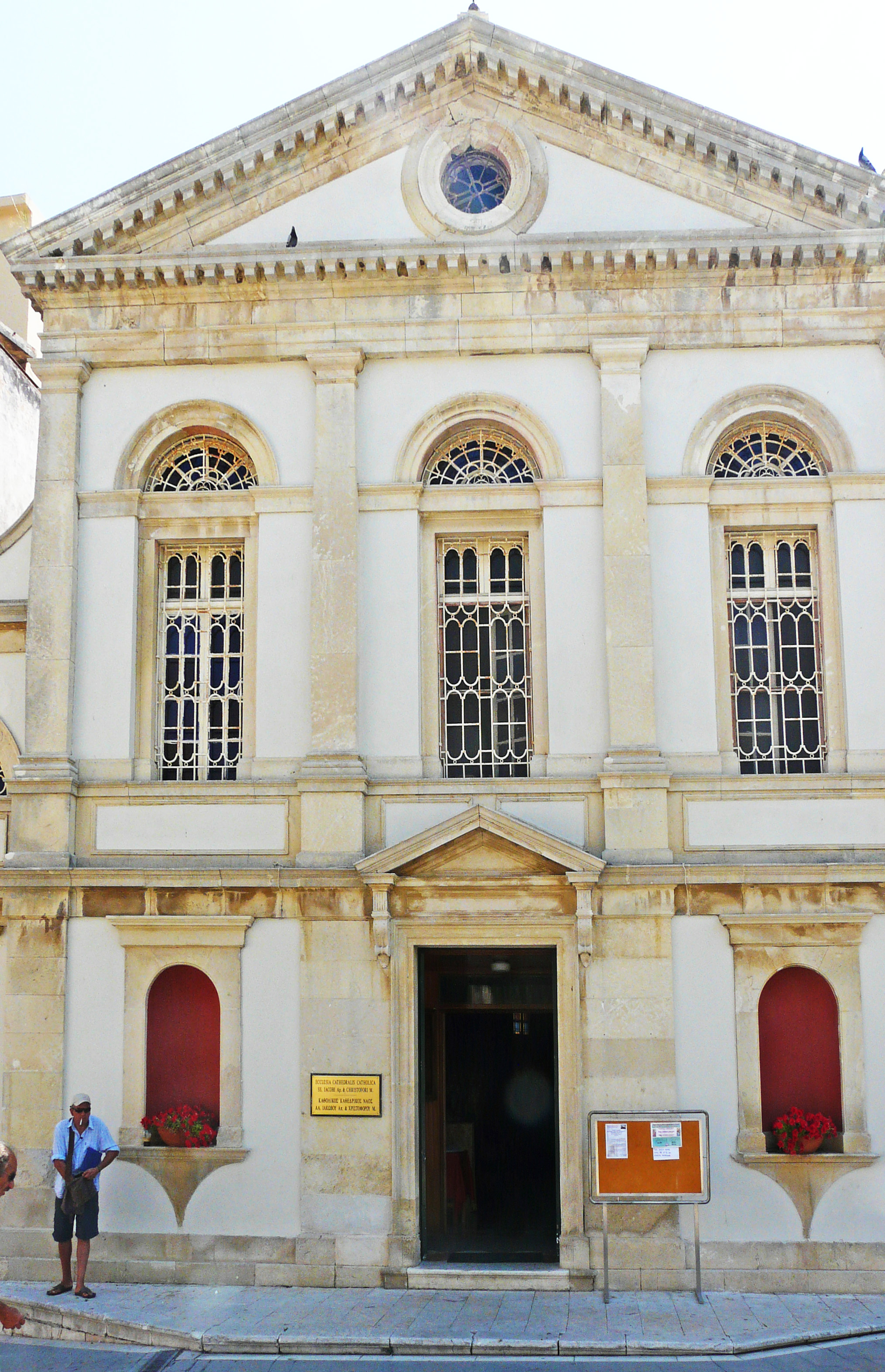
The Catholic Cathedral of Corfu

Venetians, being Catholics, retained the privileges enjoyed by the Latin bishopric of the islands under the Count Palatine dynasties. The Catholics were not numerous, and during the Venetian period, they were mainly concentrated in Corfu and Cephalonia. Most of them were descendants of Italian settlers but there were some conversions by Greeks to Catholicism. According to the law, Greek Orthodox priests and monks had to accept the Catholics as their superiors, though the Venetians placed the interests of the Republic ahead of those of the Papacy. Mixed marriages between Catholic and Orthodox Christians were allowed. These two were the main factors in the decline of Roman Catholicism in the Islands.

Jews were also a native religious group to the Islands during the Venetian period. They were even fewer in number than the Catholics; in 1797 the number of Jews in Corfu appears to have been only two thousand. Jewish presence in Corfu can be traced since the times of the Principality of Taranto. In Cephalonia, there is evidence of Jewish habitation in the old capital, the Castle of St. George, since the early 17th century. When the capital of the island was transferred to Argostoli the Jews resettled there.

=== Social structure ===
The social structure of the islands followed that of Venice. The whole population was divided into three classes: the nobles (nobili), the bourgeoisie (citadini) and the common people (populari).

== Legacy ==
The Emblem of the Septinsular Republic, based on the Flag of Venice

Across formerly Venetian-owned Greek territory, particularly the Ionian Islands, the memory of the Republic lives on in the social consciousness of the local population with a sentiment of nostalgia despite its troubled history. The sheer duration of the Venetian period has shaped modern-day Heptanesian culture into an amalgamate of its Greek and Italian heritage in all aspects of everyday life. In 1800 the Septinsular Republic was established; its flag design was based on the flag of the Republic of Venice. In addition, Italian was the co-official language of both the Septinsular Republic and the United States of the Ionian Islands. Because of its status, Italian was also taught in schools alongside Greek and English (the Ionian Islands were a protectorate of the United Kingdom from 1815 until 1864). In the first year of secondary education, for instance, Greek was taught four times a week, Italian three times and English twice. In the 1907 Greek census, 4,675 people from the Ionian Islands stated Catholicism as their denomination, about 1.8% of the total population (254,494). At the same time, 2,541 Ionians (1.0%) gave Italian as their mother tongue, making it the second most frequent language by number of speakers. The Italian language remains popular on the islands. The Hellenic Union of Heptanesians, a civil non-profit organization working to promote Septinsular culture, objected to the Ministry's decision to abolish the teaching of Italian in schools, arguing that students had a "right to be taught the language they wish, and especially Italian" as "the preferred language in the Ionian Islands and beyond". They defend its place on the regional curriculum as "a tradition" and deem it "necessary (…) owing to the scale of Italian tourism as well as other, e.g. cultural and commercial ties with the country".

These cultural remnants of the Venetian period were the pretext of Mussolini's desire to incorporate the Ionian Islands into the Kingdom of Italy. Even before the outbreak of World War II and the Greek-Italian War, Mussolini had expressed his wish to annex the Ionian Islands as part of his wider plans for an Italian Empire centered around the Mediterranean Sea. On 15 October, in a meeting in the Palazzo Venezia, he made the final decision to invade Greece. His initial goal was the occupation of Corfu, Zante and Cephalonia. After the fall of Greece, in early April 1941, the invaders divided its lands into three occupation zones; the Italians occupied much of the country, including the Ionians. Mussolini informed General Carlo Geloso that the Ionian Islands would form a separate Italian province through a de facto annexation, but the Germans would not approve it. The Italian authorities nevertheless continued to prepare the ground for the annexation. Finally, on 22 April 1941, after discussions between the German and Italian rulers, German Führer Adolf Hitler agreed that Italy could proceed with a de facto annexation of the islands. From then on, until the end of the war, the islands passed through a phase of Italianization in all areas, from their administration to their economy.

== See also ==
- Coinage of the Republic of Venice
- Corfiot Italians
- History of the Republic of Venice
- Ionian School of literature
- Ionian School of music
- Ionian School of painting
- Ottoman wars in Europe
- Stato da Màr
- Timeline of the Republic of Venice
- Bailo
