= Cinque savi alla mercanzia =

The cinque savi alla mercanzia (lit. 'five wise men on trade') was a magistracy of the Republic of Venice responsible for the oversight of trade and manufacturing.

== History ==
The magistracy was established for the first time, as an interim measure, in 1506, but was made permanent in 1517. The remit of the cinque savi alla mercanzia was from the beginning very broad, covering all aspects of overland or seaborne trade. The board was tasked with proposing laws to the Full College, reviewing the taxes levied by the governatori delle entrate and the provveditori di comun, and supervising all officials dealing with merchant goods. Along with the governatori delle entrate and the provveditori di comun, the cinque savi alla mercanzia formed a college responsible for setting customs dues on imports and exports.

The magistracy's authority was soon extended to cover wages (1540), the Levantine Jews of the Ghetto of Venice (1541), jurisdiction over the Fondaco dei Tedeschi (1550) and approval of the resolutions of lay associations (1553), the supervision of the cottimi funds (1570), and of navigation and maritime insurance (1588). Further extensions followed with jurisdiction over Ottoman Jews (1625) and Armenians (1676), combating smuggling (1682)—a special province of a member of the Five known as the inquisitore—and finally on the sale of tobacco (1723).

In 1708–1756, in an unsuccessful attempt to halt the decline of Venetian commerce, a parallel magistracy, the deputati al commercio, were established, whose meetings had to be attended by at least one of the cinque savi alla mercanzia.

== Sources ==
- Chambers, David Sanderson; Fletcher, Jennifer; Pullan, Brian, eds. (2001). Venice: A Documentary History, 1450-1630. University of Toronto Press. ISBN 978-0-802084248.
- Da Mosto, Andrea (1937). L'Archivio di Stato di Venezia. Indice Generale, Storico, Descrittivo ed Analitico. Tomo I: Archivi dell' Amministrazione Centrale della Repubblica Veneta e Archivi Notarili (in Italian). Rome: Biblioteca d'arte editrice. OCLC 772861816.
