= Giacomo Nani (admiral) =

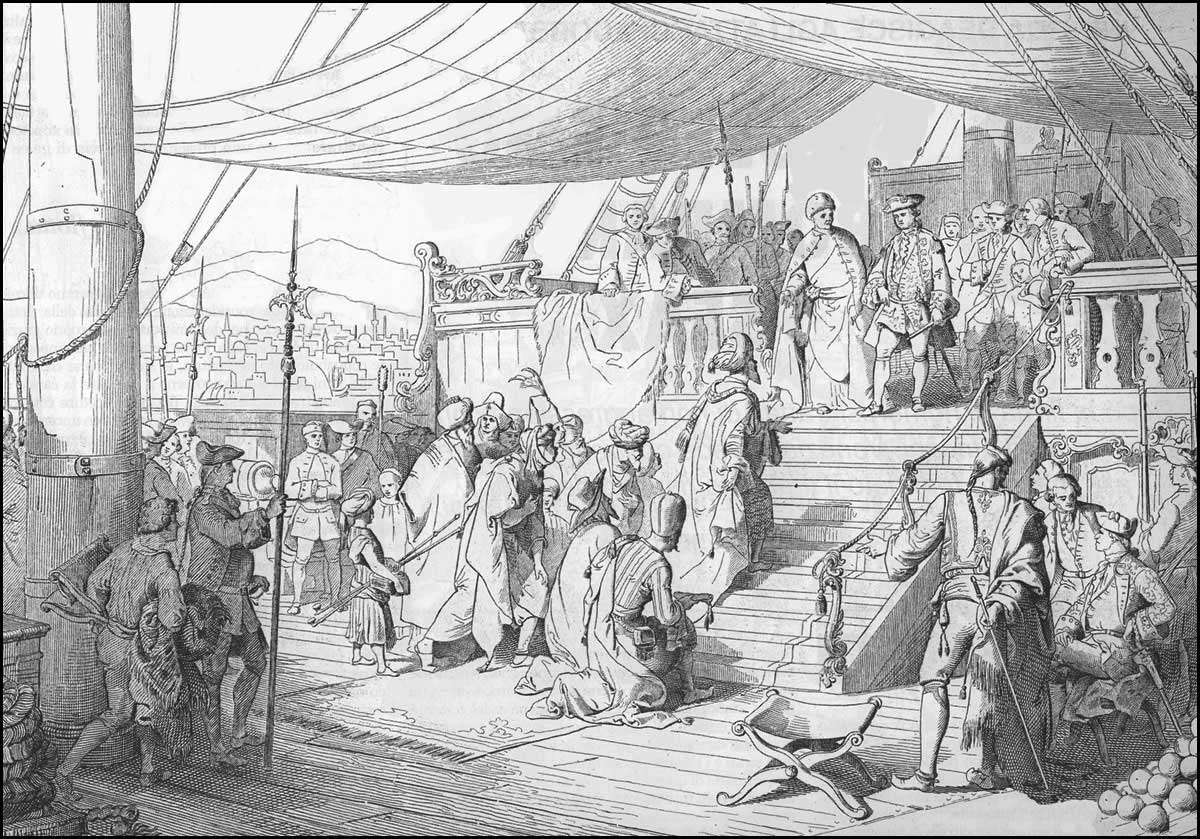
The Bey of Tripoli comes before Giacomo Nani in 1766, sketch by Giuseppe Gatteri

Jacopo or Giacomo Nani (31 January 1725 – 3 April 1797) was an admiral and politician active during the last decades of the Republic of Venice.

== Sources ==
- Del Negro, Piero (1980). "Giacomo Nani: Saggio politico del Corpo aristocratico della Repubblica di Venezia per l'anno 1756". Rivista Storica Italiana. XCII: 793–803.
- Del Negro, Piero (1980). "Giacomo Nani e l'Università di Padova nel 1781. Per una storia delle relazioni culturali tra il patriziato veneziano ei professori dello Studio durante il XVIII secolo". Quaderni per la Storia dell'Università di Padova. 13: 77–114.
- Del Negro, Piero (2012). "Nani, Giacomo". Dizionario Biografico degli Italiani (in Italian). Vol. 77: Morlini–Natolini. Rome: Istituto dell'Enciclopedia Italiana. ISBN 978-88-12-00032-6.
- Ercole, Guido (2022). Angelo Emo e Jacopo Nani. I due ammiragli che cercarono di salvare Venezia [Angelo Emo and Jacopo Nani. The Two Admirals Who Tried to Save Venice] (in Italian). Trento: Gruppo Modellistico Trentino. ISBN 978-88-98631-20-9.
