= Esecutori contro la bestemmia =

In the judicial system of the Republic of Venice, that of the Esecutori contro la bestemmia ("Executors against the Blasphemy") (or Difensori in foro secolare delle leggi di Santa Chiesa e Correttori della negligenza delle medesime, in English: "Defenders in the civil court of the laws of the Holy Church and Correctors of the negligence of said laws") was a magistracy, with competence in the city of Venice on crimes against religion and morality.

== History and functions ==
Founded in 1537, the magistracy had authority over the crimes of blasphemy, profanation, defloration of virgins promised in marriage, procuring, publication of forbidden books, etc.

By virtue of this power, this magistracy supervised taverns and casinos and appointed the district managers (two for each district, then four starting from 1583), officers responsible for reporting illegal and seditious actions and for registering foreigners present in the city.

It seems that the custom of uttering impiety was deeply rooted in the population of Venice, so much so that one of its Doges stated:

Due cose erano in Venezia molto difficili da disfare: la bestemmia usata da ogni grado di persone e li vestimenti alla francese. Two things were very difficult to undo in Venice: the blasphemy used by all levels of people and French clothes.

— Lorenzo Priuli, Diary, May 1512

== Bibliography ==
- Andrea Da Mosto, L'Archivio di Stato di Venezia, Roma, Biblioteca d'Arte editrice, 1937.
- Fabio Mutinelli, Lessico Veneto, Venezia, tipografia Giambattista Andreola, 1852.
