= Censori (Republic of Venice) =

Judicial magistracy of Republic of Venice

The censori (lit. 'censors') were a judicial magistracy of the Republic of Venice. Initially tasked with combating election fraud, it progressively assumed other responsibilities as well.

== History and role ==
Election fraud was a well-known phenomenon in the Republic of Venice, with the first known law on combating it dating back to 1303. Responsibility for applying this legislation and investigating the integrity of elections was the shared responsibility of the Council of Ten, the Avogadori de Comùn, and the Minor Council, to which were later added the auditori vecchi and the auditori novi.

The censori were established as a separate magistracy in 1517, and comprised two patricians, elected by the Great Council of Venice for one-year terms. Their remit was initially restricted to investigating complaints—including secret denunciations—of election fraud, provided there were at least two witnesses. If the two censori were unanimous, their sentences could be applied without reference to any other magistracy. The first occupants of the office showed much zeal, and the impact of the new institution was quickly felt, especially by the highest-ranking patricians. As a result, the magistracy was suppressed in 1521 and its duties handed to the Avogadori de Comùn. As accusations of fraud multiplied, the censori were restored after only three years, and with augmented powers: they now could investigate and prosecute on their own, without prior accusations.

In following centuries, the censori gradually accrued a number of other judicial duties: adjudicating domestic servants' wages, crimes related to bets or committed by the gondoliers, and in 1762 the supervision of glass manufacture, along with mirrors and pearls, passed under their purview. In 1763, a third, adjunct member was added, the Inquisitore, elected by the Venetian Senate.

== Sources ==
- Chambers, David Sanderson; Fletcher, Jennifer; Pullan, Brian, eds. (2001). Venice: A Documentary History, 1450-1630. University of Toronto Press. ISBN 978-0-802084248.
- Da Mosto, Andrea (1937). L'Archivio di Stato di Venezia. Indice Generale, Storico, Descrittivo ed Analitico. Tomo I: Archivi dell' Amministrazione Centrale della Repubblica Veneta e Archivi Notarili (in Italian). Rome: Biblioteca d'arte editrice. OCLC 772861816.
- Finlay, Robert (1980). Politics in Renaissance Venice. New Brunswick, N.J.: Rutgers University Press.
