= Action of 8 July 1716 =

1716 naval battle

Coordinates: 39.736°N 19.980°E

- Part of the Seventh Ottoman–Venetian War
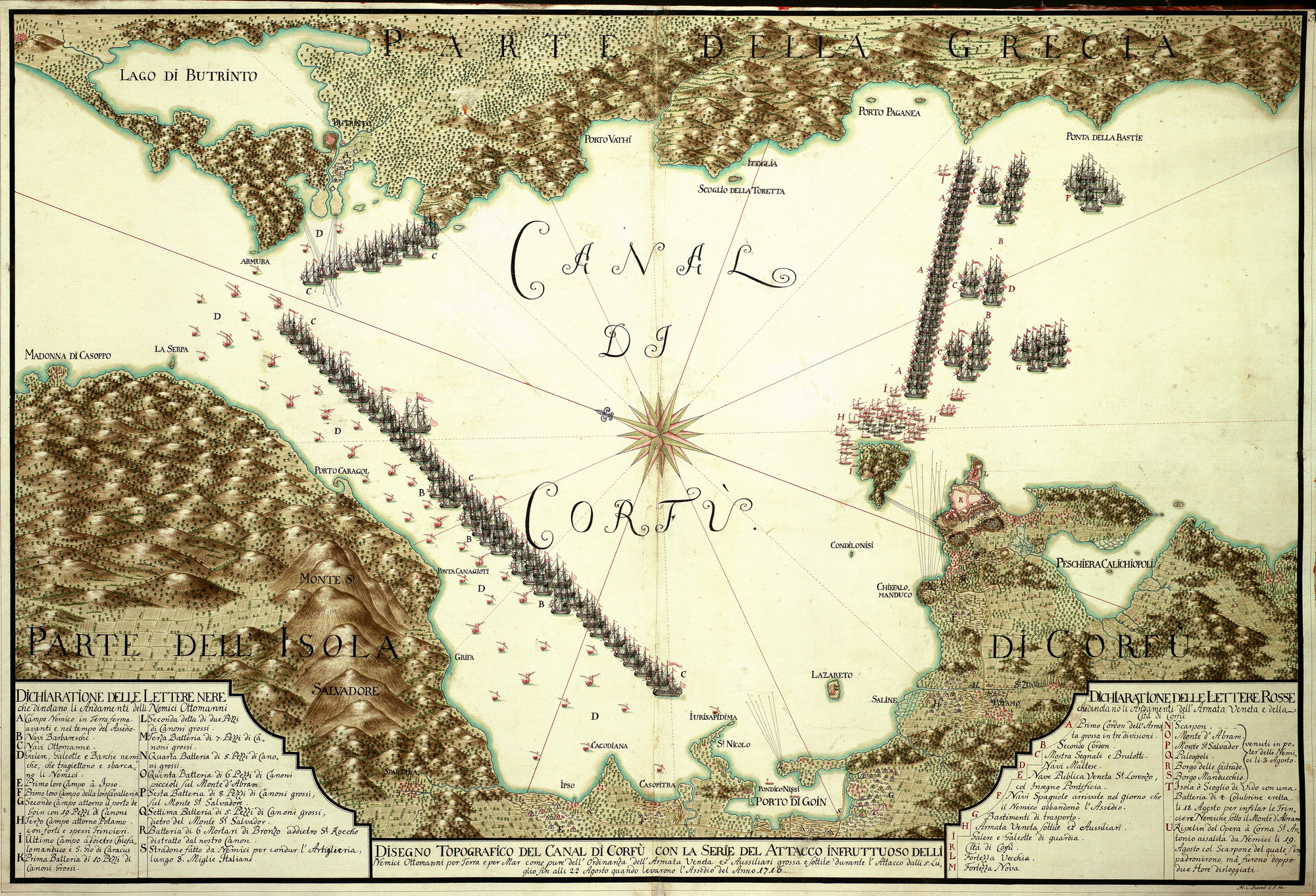
- Plan of the dispositions of the opposing fleets
Date	8 July 1716
Location	Corfu Channel
Result	Indecisive

Belligerents
Republic of Venice	Ottoman Empire

Commanders and leaders
Andrea Corner	Canum Hoca

Strength
26 ships of the line	50 ships of the line

Casualties and losses
200 killed & wounded	1,300 killed & wounded

The Action of 8 July 1716 was an indecisive naval battle that took place on 8 July 1716 during a Turkish attempt to capture the island of Corfu (Kerkyra), off the west coast of mainland Greece.

== Background ==
War had been declared between the Ottoman Empire and Venice on 9 December 1714, although it wasn't until June 1715 that a Turkish fleet left the Dardanelles Strait. Soon Venice had been forced out of almost all of the Morea.

In 1716, the Turks goal was the capture of the western Greek island of Corfu. This island forms a horseshoe shape, with the two ends close to the Greek mainland, and forms a bay with two narrow entrances. On the island, midway between the two entrances, is the town also called Corfu. Because of the prevailing winds it is difficult for sailing fleets to sail into this bay from the south.

The Turkish fleet, under Kapudan Pasha Canum Hoca left the Dardanelles Strait in May 1716 and made its way around the Morea. While keeping his rowed warships in Corfu, the Venetian Captain General of the Sea, Andrea Pisani, sent his more manoeuvreable ships of the line ahead, under the Capitano Straordinario delle Navi Andrea Corner, to observe the straits between the Morea and Crete for the Ottomans' approach. As the Turks approached he withdrew northward to Zante (Zakynthos). On 22 June, Pisani sent Corner to intercept the Ottoman fleet, but the Ottomans chose to bypass the straits between the Ionian Islands and the mainland and sail out into the open sea, rounding on Corfu from the northwest. The Ottomans arrived in the northern exit of the Corfu Channel on 5 July, and readied themselves to ferry across an Ottoman army of 30,000 infantry and 3,000 cavalry, that had gathered on the mainland shore at Butrint.

Pisani, having to confront the far superior Ottoman fleet of 62 ships with only his rowed vessels, decided not to risk a battle. He withdrew his vessels under the guns of Corfu's fortresses, and later, on 5 July, he and abandoned his station in the Corfu Channel for the open sea, hoping to find Corner's squadron, which he had not heard from for several days. After a search for the Turks, Corner realised on 27 June that they had sailed past him further out to sea, and he proceeded back to Corfu, following the Ottoman fleet at a few days distance. As a result, instead of entering the Corfu Channel from the south, he sailed up the western side of the island and thence to Otranto, where he learned, on the morning of 7 July, of the Ottomans' arrival at Corfu two days earlier. On 8 July the Turks began landing troops from the mainland across to the north of the island. Meanwhile, Corner crossed to the Albanian coast with his 27 ships and sailed south, sailing through the northern channel and attacking the Turkish fleet, which was anchored off the town, at 1pm on 8 July.

== Order of battle ==
The Venetian squadron consisted of 26 ships, all sailing ships of the line:

- Madonna delta Salute (70 guns)
- Costanza (70 guns)
- Trionfo (70 guns)
- Colomba d'Oro (70 guns)
- Grand'Alessandro (70 guns)
- Corona (70 guns)
- S. Lorenzo (70 guns)
- Madonna dell'Arsenal (70 guns)
- Aquila Valiera (or Volante) (70 guns)
- Iride (60 guns)
- S. Andrea (60 guns)
- S. Francesco (60 guns)
- Fede (60 guns)
- Fenice (60 guns)
- Nettuno (60 guns)
- S. Pietro Apostolo (60 guns)
- Rosa (60 guns)
- Madonna del Rosario (60 guns)
- Aquileta (50 guns)
- Vittoria (50 guns)
- Venezia Trionfante (50 guns)
- Scudo della Fede (50 guns)
- Valor Incoronato (50 guns)
- S. Paolo (50 guns)
- Santissimo Crocefisso (50 guns)
- Santissima Nunziata (50 guns)

Corner's subordinate commanders were the Capitano Ordinario delle Navi Lodovico Flangini, the Almirante Marcantonio Diedo, and the Patron Francesco Correr.

According to an escaped Spanish prisoner, the Turks had perhaps 62 vessels total, of which about 50 were proper warships. These included one 96-gun battleship (the fleet flagship), 12 battleships of up to 84 guns, and 10 ships from the Ottomans' Barbary vassals of 50 lighter guns each. The remaining Ottoman vessels had 54 guns. On the other hand, a Venetian list from 1716 gives the strength of the main Ottoman fleet (excluding the vassal ships) as one ship of 112 guns, two of 88 guns, one of 72 guns, 25 of 50–64 guns, and six of 28–48 guns.

== Battle ==
The first Venetian ship to open fire was Marcantonio Diedo's Aquila. The Barbary warships stayed where they were, close to the mainland coast, but the Turks weighed anchor and sailed north, Canum Hoca in the van attacking the Venetian van, under Corner, then the rear, under Flangini. Corner turned to assist, then the Venetians turned to stay ahead of the wind, and attempted to launch a fireship attack against a compact group of eight Ottoman warships, which failed when the Ottoman galleys towed their sailing ships out of action. The action lasted between about 14:30 and 19:00, when approaching darkness and lack of wind stopped the battle. The Venetian fleet sailed south and anchored in a line just north of the town, with direction from northwest to southeast, with the Turks slightly to the north near Butrint.

Venetian casualties were 70 killed and 130 wounded—Anderson gives 116 killed and 250 wounded—while Ottoman casualties were much heavier, with some prisoners putting them as high a 1,300 men. Corner also claimed to have sunk two ships of the line, a galleon and two galliots, but in reality no ship was sunk during the battle.

This battle, although itself indecisive, showed that the Turkish sailing fleet could be faced, if not necessarily beaten, even if in superior numbers.

== Aftermath ==
On 10 July, the Turks resumed crossing troops to the island, and for the next 6 weeks the fleets largely sat idle even while battle raged continuously on land between the Turks and the troops protecting the town.

Pisani sailed up the west coast of the island, returning with the new 80-gun battleship Leone Trionfante, two troopships containing 1,500 troops and a cargo ship containing food. On 21 July the Maltese reinforcements of four ships of the line, five galleys and two small craft arrived, followed on 31 July by four Papal, five Spanish, three Tuscan and two Genoese galleys and four hired Papal ships of the line.

There was some attempt to attack, but this was not carried out largely due to lack of wind, and all that was done was to use galleys to support an assault from the town on 18/19 August. This failed, and there was a Turkish counter-assault. On 21 August, six Spanish battleships, under the Marquis de Mari, arrived, and on the same day the Turkish cavalry re-embarked. On 25 August the Turks sailed to the northern channel, leaving on 26 August.

== Sources ==
- Anderson, R. C. (1952). Naval wars in the Levant 1559–1853. Princeton: Princeton University Press. hdl:2027/mdp.39015005292860.
- Nani Mocenigo, Mario (1935). Storia della marina veneziana: da Lepanto alla caduta della Repubblica [History of the Venetian navy: from Lepanto to the fall of the Republic] (in Italian). Rome: Tipo lit. Ministero della Marina - Uff. Gabinetto., pp. 325–326
