= Tommaso Condulmer =

Venetian naval officer and nobleman (1759–1823)

- Born: 20 August 1759; Venice, Republic of Venice
- Died: 7 January 1823 (aged 63) Venice, Italy
- Allegiance: Republic of Venice (?–1797); Napoleonic Italy (1805–1814)
- Branch: (Republic of Venice) Venetian Navy
- Rank: Almirante
- Conflicts: Venetian bombardments of the Beylik of Tunis

Tommaso Condulmer (20 August 1759 – 7 January 1823) was a Venetian naval officer and nobleman. After the death of Angelo Emo he took command of the Venetian navy, and held major responsibilities in the aborted defense of Venice against Napoleon's forces which eventually led to the fall of the Republic of Venice in 1797.

== Biography ==
Tommaso Condulmer was born in Venice on 20 August 1759 to the patrician Condulmer family. His father was Domenico Condulmer, and his mother Elisabetta Soranzo. He enrolled in the Venetian navy at a very young age, and rose rapidly through the ranks to become commander of his own ship (Governatore di Nave) by 1784, when he participated in Angelo Emo's expeditionary fleet against the Beylik of Tunis.

In late 1786, Condulmer was elected Patron delle Navi (rear admiral) and replaced Emo on station off the Tunisian coast with a small squadron, while the main fleet returned to Corfu. Raising his flag on the great frigate Sirena, Condulmer patrolled the Tunisian waters for the next few years until the death of Emo and the conclusion of peace in 1792. When Emo died at Malta in 1792, Condulmer, now Almirante (vice admiral) took over command of the Venetian sailing fleet, being awarded a Knight of the Order of the Golden Stole (or Order of Saint Mark but for patricians) as well.

In 1796, as Venice was facing a French invasion led by Napoleon, Condulmer was appointed second-in-command to the Provveditore alle Lagune e ai Lidi, charged with defending the Venetian Lagoon; the latter post was initially held by the former admiral Giacomo Nani, who energetically organized the naval defences. But when he died, his successor, the senator Giovanni Zusto, was far less decisive, and Condulmer was outright defeatist, disparaging any attempt to defend against the French as pointless, thus decisively contributing to the Fall of the Republic of Venice.

Faced with accusations of treason, Condulmer was forced to compose an exculpatory work in his defence (Il cittadino Tommaso Condulmer agli amatori della verita) but otherwise remained aloof from politics, living retired at Treviso. In 1805, Napoleon, now King of Italy, appointed him a gentleman-attendant to Princess Augusta of Bavaria, and created him a count, senator, and a knight in the Order of the Iron Crown. He died in Venice on 7 January 1823.

== Bibliography ==
- Anderson, R. C. (1952). Naval Wars in the Levant 1559–1853. Princeton: Princeton University Press.
- Ercole, Guido (2022). Angelo Emo e Jacopo Nani. I due ammiragli che cercarono di salvare Venezia [Angelo Emo and Jacopo Nani. The Two Admirals Who Tried to Save Venice] (in Italian). Trento: Gruppo Modellistico Trentino. ISBN 978-88-98631-20-9.
- Nani Mocenigo, Mario (1935). Storia della marina veneziana: da Lepanto alla caduta della Repubblica [History of the Venetian Navy: from Lepanto to the Fall of the Republic] (in Italian). Rome: Tipo lit. Ministero della Marina – Uff. Gabinetto.
- Moro, Federico (2012). Angelo Emo, eroe o traditore? La rivoluzione fallita dell'ultimo dei veneziani [Angelo Emo, Hero or Traitor? The Failed Revolution of the Last of the Venetians] (in Italian). Venice: Studio Lt2. ISBN 978-88-88028-90-3.
