= Battle of Imbros (1717) =

Battle during the Ottoman–Venetian War of 1714–1718

Coordinates: 40°09′39″N 25°50′40″E

- Part of the Seventh Ottoman–Venetian War
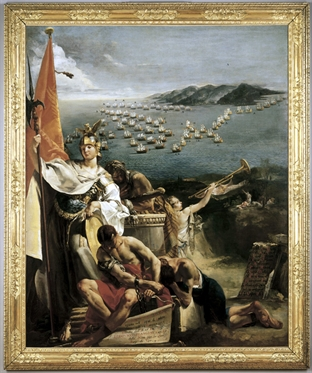
- A depiction of the Battle of Imbros
Date	12–16 June 1717
Location	Imbros
Result	Indecisive

Belligerents
Ottoman Empire: Karamanli dynasty	Republic of Venice

Commanders and leaders
Ibrahim Pasha	Lodovico Flangini (DOW)

Strength
44 warships	26 warships

Casualties and losses
Unknown casualties, 6 ships badly damaged	1,390 casualties, Colomba badly damaged
- No ships were sunk in this action.

The Battle of Imbros was a naval clash that took place on 12, 13 and 16 June 1717 near Imbros in the Aegean Sea, between the sailing fleets of Venice and the Ottoman Empire. The outnumbered Venetian Armada Grossa, under the Capitano Straordinario delle Navi Lodovico Flangini, proved herself able to match a superior Turkish force under the Kapudan Pasha Hodja Ibrahim Pasha in a manoeuvred fight that lasted nearly ten days. The outcome of this tough battle was unclear, since both fleet retired to their bases badly damaged, after Flangini died of wounds on the 22nd.

== Prelude ==
The Venetians had left Corfu on 10 May 1717 with 25 battleships, hoping to intercept the Ottomans still inside the Dardanelles. After reaching the island of Zante, their fleet was joined on 18 May by Gloria Veneta. On 26 May the Armada Grossa left Zante with eighteen transport ships, sailing towards the Dardanelles Strait, and on 8 June dropped anchors south of Imbros. From here, two corvettes were sent towards the Straits, where they found that the Ottoman fleet was composed of 34 battleships and 6 berbery ships.

On 10 June at 9 am, the scouts reported that the Ottoman fleet were leaving the Dardanelles with 38 battleships and 6 galliots. Strong winds damaged some Venetian ships and forced them to remain at anchors. It was impossible to weather Imbros, so Flangini formed a line on the starboard tack heading toward Thasos. In the meantime the Ottoman fleet had anchored just outside the Dardanelles.

== Battle ==
=== 12 June ===
For two days Flangini tried to reach a favorable position, but the strong adverse winds forced him to give up and anchor in lee of Imbros at about 12 pm on 12 June. The wind then suddenly turned ENE, in favour of the Ottomans, who promptly set sails. Because of the current, they reached the Venetians before there was time to form a correct line and Flangini signalled to form up in any order. At 3:30 pm fighting began in the Rear with 8 Ottoman ships attacking Colomba, Trionfo, flagship of Flangini's second in command, the Capitano delle Navi Marcantonio Diedo, and San Lorenzo.

At 4:30 pm, the Ottoman fleet divided into two divisions, the first, with lighter ships, sailed towards the Venetians rear, while the other, under Kapudan Pasha Hodja Ibrahim Pasha, headed to the vanguard. Shortly after, Colomba was hit twice below the waterline and, leaking badly, was forced to leave the line. After further fighting, by about 9 pm the Ottoman ships retreated, when one of their fireships was sunk trying to set afire Trionfo. In the vanguard, the Venetians had formed a good line of 1st-rates: at about 6 pm these were attacked by the main group of Ottoman ships, and the fighting last till about 9 pm. That night the damaged Venetians sailed westward. German troops aboard the heavy damaged Colomba nearly mutinied and were transferred on the San Gaetano. Venetian so far suffered 183 deads and 394 wounded, of which 98 aboard the Trionfo; (Note: According to Anderson (p. 253), these were the numbers reported in Flangini's despatch, while a manuscript in the British Museum speak of 176 killed and 372 wounded, a total of 548, and another manuscript in the Marciana Library gives a total of 582.) Captain Damian Pendesich of the Terror was killed, and Iseppo Caenazzo, flag captain of Marcantonio Diedo on the Trionfo, had been seriously wounded. According to the despatches sent by Flangini and Diedo, the Venetian fleet suffered damage to some sails and unimportant spars, while a manuscript account spoke of four top mizzen masts lost, several upper-deck guns dismounted on the Leon Trionfante and the fore topmast lost on the San Pietro.

=== 13–14 June ===
On 13 June, the Venetians were near the western end of Lemnos, with the Ottoman fleet to the north. Flangini formed a line on the starboard tack. Colomba was to leeward, its place taken by Corona. Towards evening the Ottoman fleet sailed before a north wind and nearly cut off Trionfo and San Lorenzo, which had dropped back. Flangini turned to support his second in command, and at the same time the wind turned to the west, putting him to windward. With the loss of the wind gauge, the Ottomans retired after only two of their ships had opened fire, and disappeared in the darkness.

At daybreak on the 14th, the Venetians, having kept on the starboard tack with the wind blowing NNW, were between Lemnos and Mount Athos, with the Ottoman fleet to windwards. Flangini held on sailing westward, while the Ottoman fleet turned and stood towards the island of Lemnos.

=== 16 June ===
On 15 June, the Venetians were becalmed between Mount Athos and Strati. They sailed north slightly in an attempt to get the wind gauge, but on 16 June the Ottoman fleet appeared to windward (NE). Flangini tried to form a NNW line but some ships couldn't keep station and he formed an ESE line instead. At about 9 am fighting began in the Van and included all of the line in about 30 minutes. Flangini, hit at midday by a musket ball in the neck, fell unconscious and was at first believed dead, just as the nearly dismasted flagship of Hodja Ibrahim Pasha was towed out of the battle line by two galiots. At 2:30 pm, after 5 hours of fighting, the Ottoman fleet withdrew towards Lemnos with 6 ships more or less dismasted and the Venetians, left without orders, lost an opportunity of going about and getting the wind gauge, and instead retired to Thermia. The Venetian fleet lost this day 261 killed and 543 wounded: Flangini's flagship, the Leon Trionfante, lost 87 killed and wounded, and her next astern, the Madonna dell'Arsenal, 109. Flangini's despatch of 21 June accounted for 833 casualties, making about 1390 casualties for the whole battle. (Note: According to Anderson (p. 254) these are the number reported by Flangini's despatch of 21 June. The British Museum's manuscript gives 272 killed and 574 wounded, a total of 846. Andrea Pisani, on 30 June, reported 1381 casualties as the total, 444 killed and 397 wounded.)

== Aftermath ==
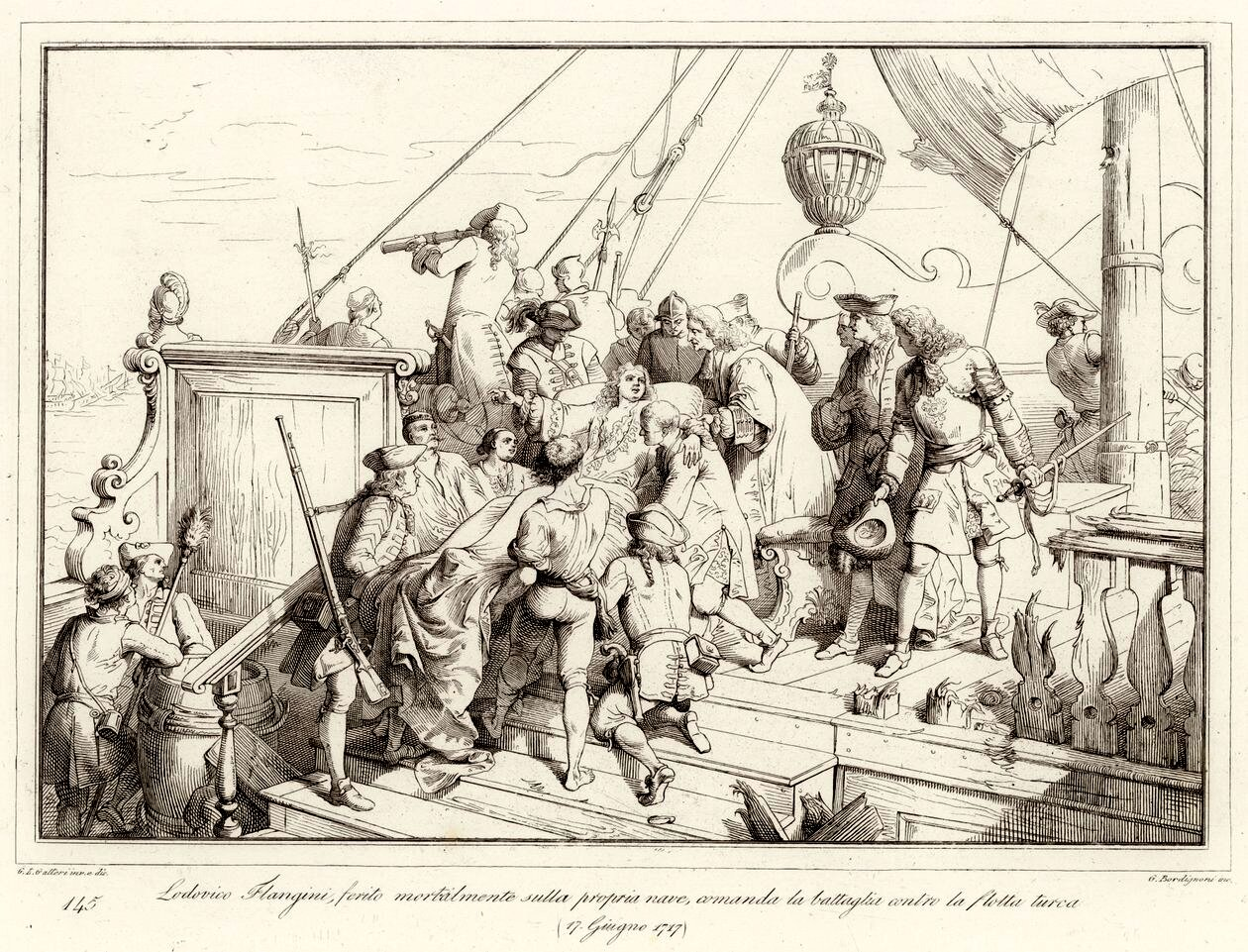
Drawing by Giuseppe Gatteri (1829–1884) depicting the last moments of Lodovico Flangini on board the Leon Trionfante, 22 June 1717.

The following day, the Venetian fleet lay becalmed, and on the 18th Flangini recovered well enough – or Diedo ultimately took command, the situation is unclear – to set sail for repairs at Skyros or Andros, but the wind that blew hard from north made the weather so bad that it was not possible to bring up before reaching Thermia, 50 miles (80 km) south of Negropont, in the evening of 19 June. On the 22nd the Venetian fleet was disturbed by seven Ottoman ships, that attacked the scouts. Flangini, who asked to be brought on his ship's deck to direct the operation even in his dire condition, weighted anchors and formed a battle line, forcing the Ottomans to withdraw. Exhausted by those last efforts, Flangini died later that day, and Diedo succeeded him.

The Rear Admiral assessed that his fleet needed to be reinforced before he could successfully re-engage the Ottomans. As a result, he retired to the south of Morea, where he hoped to find his superior in command, the Capitano Generale da Mar Andrea Pisani.

Diedo brought the fleet to Marathonisi, north to Cape Matapan, where he dropped anchors on 28 June. There he was joined, on 1 July, by the vessel Fortuna Guerriera and the allied squadron of seven Portuguese and two Maltese ships under the pontifical General Lieutenant Chevalier de Bellefontaine. Pisani also arrived with the Armada Sottile (the galley fleet) on the 12th. This situation evolved in the following Battle of Matapan.

== Ships involved ==
=== Venice ===
- Red Division – Vanguard
  - Leon Trionfante (Triumphant Lion) 70 guns (flagship of Capitano Straordinario delle Navi Lodovico Flangini)
  - Aquila Valiera (Valieran Eagle) 70 guns
  - Grand'Alessandro (Big Alexander) 70 guns
  - Costanza (Constance) 70 guns
  - Madonna de l'Arsenal (Madonna of the Arsenal) 68 guns
  - San Francesco da Paola 60 guns
  - Fenice (Phoenyx) 60 guns
  - Sant'Andrea 60 guns
  - Corona (Crown) 74 guns
- Yellow Division – Center
  - Madonna della Salute (Madonna of Health) 70 guns
  - Terror 70 guns (flagship of Capitano delle Navi Marcantonio Diedo)
  - San Pietro Apostolo, bought in Malta, 50 guns
  - Nostra Signora del Rosario, bought in Genua, 58 guns
  - Gloria Veneta (Venetian Glory) 68 guns
  - Nettuno (Neptune) 52 guns
  - Aquiletta (Little Eagle), also reported as Aquila Volante, 52 guns
  - Fede Guerriera (Warrior Faith) 60 guns
- Blue Division – Rearguard (Note: The Rear Division was under the orders of the Almirante Francesco Correr, but sources are unclear about what ship was his flagship.)
  - San Pio Quinto (Saint Pius V) 68 guns
  - Sacra Lega (Holy League) 50 guns
  - Valor Coronato (Crowned Valour) 52 guns
  - San Gaetano 68 guns
  - Rosa (Rose), also reported as Rosa Moceniga, 60 guns
  - Venezia Trionfante (Triumphant Venice), 52 guns
  - Trionfo (Triumph) 70 guns
  - San Lorenzo Zustinian II 70 guns
  - Colomba d'oro (Golden Dove), also reported as Colomba, 70 guns
- Out of the battle line
  - Ercole Vittorioso (Victorious Heracles) 44 guns
  - 4 fireships
  - 3 signal ships
  - 2 corvettes
  - 1 armed merchant
  - 2 other ships

=== Ottoman Empire ===
- Kebir Üç Ambarlı (The Great Three Decker) 114 guns/1500 crew,
- Ejder Başlı (The Dragon) 900 crew,
- Şadırvan Kıçlı (The Sprinkling Fountain) 66 guns/750 crew,
- Siyah At Başlı (The Black Horse) 750 crew,
- Çifte Ceylan Kıçlı (The Two Gazelles) 70 guns/900 crew,
- Beyaz At Başlı (The White Horse) 66 guns/750 crew,
- Kula At Başlı (The Grey Horse) 700 crew,
- Yaldızlı Hurma (The Gilded Date) 70guns/750 crew,
- Büyük Gül Başlı (The Great Rose) 66 guns/700 crew,
- Yılan Başlı (The Snake) 34 guns/750 crew (unique ship with 2x"üç kantar" monster guns firing marble balls),
- Ifrit Başlı (The Demon) 62 guns/650 crew,
- Çifte Teber Kıçlı (Two Halberds) 58 guns,
- Küçük Gül Başlı (The Little Rose) 60 guns/600 crew,
- Zülfikâr Kıçlı (The Two Pointed Sword) 56 guns/650 crew,
- Akçaşehir (Town of Akçaşehir) 56 guns/600 crew,
- Al At Başlı (The Red Horse) 450 crew,
- Servi Bagçeli (The Cypress Garden) 54 guns/500 crew,
- Siyah Arslan Başlı (The Black Lion),
- Ay Bagçeli (The Moon Garden) 54 guns/450 crew,
- Yıldız Bagçeli (The Star Garden) 58 guns/450 crew,
- Yaldızlı Nar Kıçlı (The Gilded Grenade) 52 guns/450 crew,
- Yeşil Kuşaklı (Green Belted) 400 crew,
- Sarı Kuşaklı (Yellow Belted) 54 guns/400 crew,
- Kırmızı Kuşaklı (Red Belted) 52 guns/400 crew,
- Mavi Arslan Başlı (The Blue Lion) 44 guns/400 crew,
- Taç Başlı (The Crown),
- Yıldız Kıçlı (The Star) 40 guns/300 crew,
- Güneş Kıçlı (The Sun) 44 guns/300 crew,
- Mavi Kıçlı Karavele (The Blue Caravella) 38 guns/250 crew,
- Kuş Bagçeli Karavele (The Bird Garden Caravella) 44 guns/300 crew

== Bibliography ==
- Alperen Aydin, Yusuf (2011). Sultanin Kalyonlari: Osmanli donanmasinin yelkenli savas gemileri, 1701–1770. Istanbul: Küre Yayinlari. ISBN 9789756614969.
- Anderson, R. C. (1952). Naval Wars in the Levant 1559–1853. Princeton: Princeton University Press.
- Ercole, Guido (2011). Vascelli e fregate della Serenissima. Trento: GMT. ISBN 978-8890565144.
