= Battle of Mytilene =

The Battle of Mytilene may refer to:

- Battle of Mytilene (406 BC), fought between Athens and Sparta
- Battle of Mytilene (427 BC), fought between Mytilene and Athens
- Battle of Mytilene (1457), naval battle between the Roman Catholic Church under Ludovico Trevisan and the Ottoman Empire
- Battle of Mytilene (1690), naval battle between a Venetian fleet under Daniele Dolphin and a combined Muslim fleet
