= Venetian bombardments of the Beylik of Tunis =

- Part of the European conflicts with the Barbary states
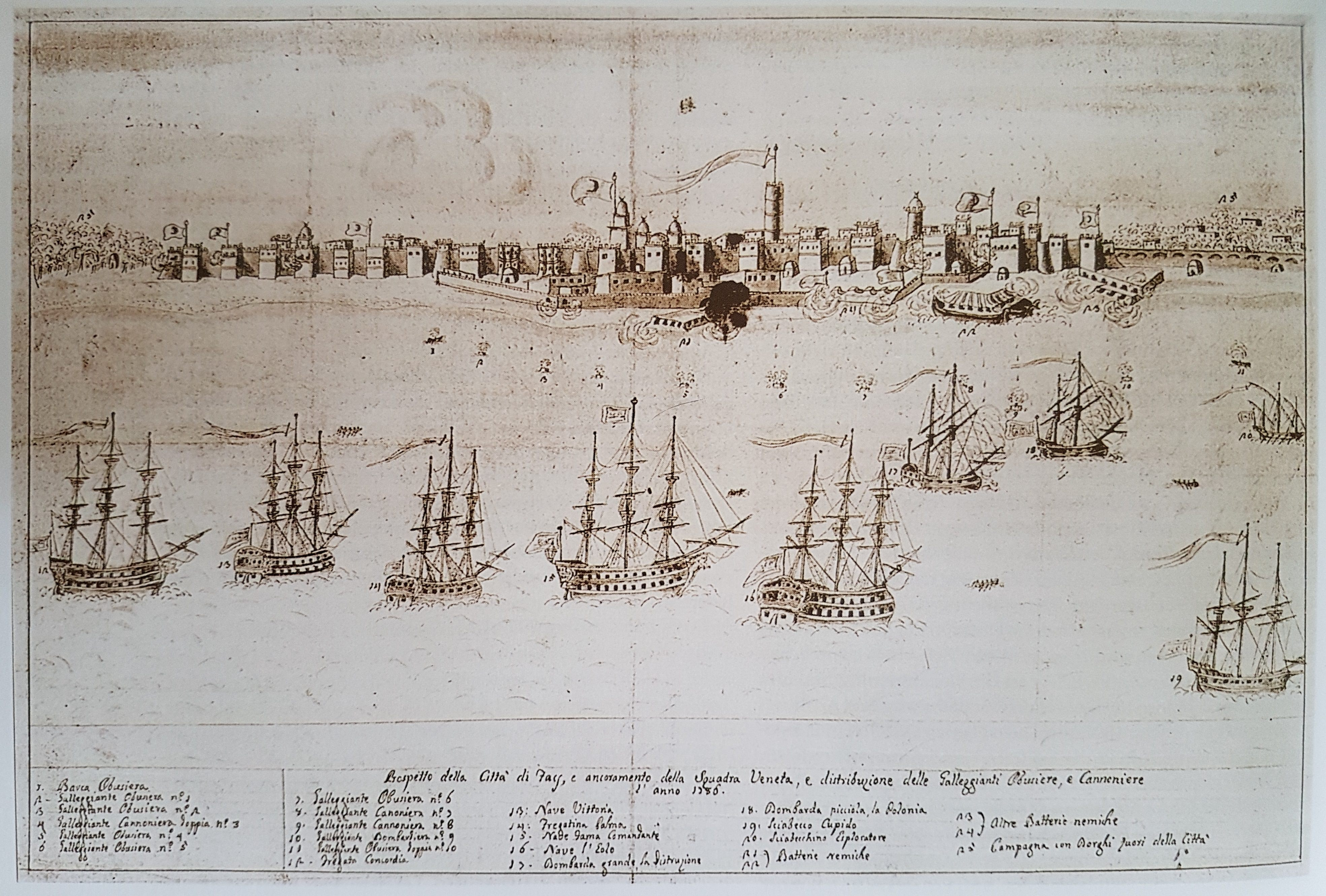
- A contemporary sketch of the bombardments in 1784
Date	June 1784 – 1786
Location	Porto Farina, Tunis, Sfax, Bizerte, Sousse

Belligerents
Venice	Beylik of Tunis

Commanders and leaders
Angelo Emo; Andrea Querini; Tommaso Condulmer	Hammuda ibn Ali

Strength
Various tall ships 2 bomb ketches 9 bomb rafts	Coastal defences Naval batteries Several ships

The Venetian bombardments of the Beylik of Tunis were a series of naval bombardments of the capital and various port cities of the Beylik of Tunis by the Venetian navy in retaliation for the support Bey Hammuda ibn Ali gave to Barbary pirates who harassed Venetian-flagged shipping. The campaign lasted from 1784 to 1786, with the Venetian navy under Angelo Emo bombarding the harbour towns of Tunisia. The conflict dragged on until 1792, but no major naval actions were undertaken after the winter of 1786/87.

== Background ==
War broke out between the Beylik of Tunis and the Republic of Venice after a Venetian-flagged merchant ship laden with goods from the Barbary coast was burned by the authorities in Malta due to it being infected with the plague. The Bey of Tunis demanded compensation, but received none, and his demands for an increased annual payment went unheeded. As a result, he declared war on Venice. A Venetian squadron under the Patron delle Navi Andrea Querini was already on station to monitor the Tunisian fleet, but it was evidently not enough. In response, the Venetians appointed the distinguished admiral Angelo Emo as Capitano Straordinario delle Navi, and tasked him with conducting the war against the Bey.

== 1784 ==
Emo's fleet left Venice on 21 June 1784, slowly sailing to Corfu, where he was joined by additional vessels. At the time, in Dalmatia the bubonic plague was ravaging the city of Spalato, and all the ports and cities of this province were under quarantine. Given that men from Kotor could be infected, Emo could not drop anchor in that harbour until 7 August. The Venetians started to do shooting practices with the heavy mortars of the bomb vessels (two 340-pounders and two 135-pounders), that evidenced some issues to their beds.

The fleet he led towards Tunis on 12 August comprised the ships of the line Fama (60 guns), Forza (70 guns), Concordia (66 guns) and Palma (40 guns), the xebecs Cupido and Nettuno, the bomb-vessels Distruzione and Polonia, and the galiot Esploratore. On 18 August, Emo was in sight of Sicily. On 26 August, he passed the island of Malta; and on 30 August, he arrived in the bay of Tunis. Here the squadron was subject to terrible weather and unable to move for three days. On 3 September, the Venetian ships – while sailing to get closer to the city – found a Neapolitan tartana (a type of small merchant ship) that had been captured by the Barbary pirates shortly after and re-captured it.

Emo left this prize with the Forza and Nettuno on blockade duty while he moved the rest of the fleet northwards as far as Cape Farina. A few days later, Emo sailed for Sardinia to water and remained there from 14 to 22 September. He met the Forza and her consorts at sea on the 25th. Instead of returning to La Goulette, the fleet sailed further south and anchored off Sousse on 1 October. Bad weather delayed operations, but from 5 to 7 October, Sousse was bombarded by the bomb-vessels and battleships, though without any very great effect. Damage to the beds of the mortars in the bomb-vessels and renewed bad weather interrupted the attack, but it was resumed on the 12th for a short time.

After this action, Emo moved to Tripoli, where he was well received. The bomb-vessels were sent to Trapani in Sicily for repairs. The captain of the Forza, Alessandro Mora, died at Trapani from blood poisoning caused by an injury to his hand that had occurred during the action off Sousse. As Emo's fleet entered the harbour of Trapani on 19 November, bad weather struck and the Forza was sunk, but with little loss of life.

== 1785 ==
Sites of the Venetian bombardment campaign in Tunisia

In January, the two xebecs sailed for Tunis. Nettuno was nearly wrecked near Palermo and had to cut away her masts, so Cupido returned to Trapani. In February, Cupido set out again to take new gear to her consort. At the same time, on 11 February 1785, Emo sailed for Malta with the Fama, Concordia, and Palma. He returned to Trapani on 22 March, and on 6 April the whole fleet again put to sea. The Concordia and Distruzione were off La Goulette on 13 April, and the rest followed four days later. They left again for Trapani on 1 May after an unsuccessful attempt at negotiation.

=== Sousse and Sfax ===
Arriving at Trapani on 7 May, Emo was again at sea from the 12 May to 8 June, and then leaving there on 21 June entered Malta two days later. He was joined by the 70-gun ship Eolo on the 30th, and started for Sousse on 11 July with the Fama, Eolo, Concordia, Palma, the two bomb-vessels and two other small craft. Arriving there on 20 July, he was again hampered by bad weather, but his bomb-vessels were able to fire on the city in the nights of the 21 July, 27 July and 31 July to 4 August. A good deal of damage was done, but the result was not altogether satisfactory given that more than 400 large bombs were thrown. On 6 August, Emo left Sousse and moved south to Sfax, sending the Eolo back to Trapani with the sick, and the Concordia to watch La Goulette. He reached Sfax six days later and bombarded it on the 15th and 16th with much the same result as before. He left on 18 August, had to anchor at the Kerkennah Islands till 23 August, and reached Trapani again on 1 September.

=== La Goulette ===
At Trapani, the Venetians were joined on 6 September by a considerable reinforcement from Venice, comprising the Sirena (60 guns), the Vittoria (70 guns), the Cavalier Angelo "transport frigate" and two smaller craft. With his augmented fleet now consisting of five 'first-rates' (as the Venetians accounted them) and heavy frigates, one light frigate, two xebecs, 1 galeot and 2 bomb-vessels, Emo left Trapani on 16 September and appeared off La Goulette on the 22nd, after a rather hard passage. Enquiries showed that the Tunisian government was not likely to respond favourably to offers of negotiation and he therefore prepared for drastic action.

Emo had constructed two rafts formed from casks and spare yards, on each of which was mounted one of his heaviest guns with a sandbag parapet as protection as in a floating battery. He also mounted a howitzer in the Vittoria's longboat. With these and with the two bomb-vessels he engaged the fortifications of La Goulette and the two Tunisian gunboats in the harbour mouth on 3 and 5 October. After a pause for bad weather, the other ships joined them for a final attack on 10 October. Much damage was done ashore and one of the gunboats was disabled, but an exchange of letters found the Bey still obdurate. The rafts were dismembered and on 20 October, Emo sailed for Malta, where he arrived on 8 November. He was soon followed by the rest of his fleet.

The Sirena and Eolo were sent out a month later to cruise eastward for the protection of Venetian commerce, while the Concordia and Esploratore worked along the south coast of Sicily to Trapani and back. On 15 December. Emo took the Fama, Vittoria and Palma in the direction of Tunis, partly in the hope of picking up prizes and partly to resume the exchange of letters with the Tunisian government using a British ship. Nothing came of these dispositions; the Sirena and Eolo returned on 16 December, the Concordia on the 27th, and Emo himself on the 31st, all without meeting the enemy. The attempts at negotiation had also been fruitless.

== 1786 ==
=== Sfax ===
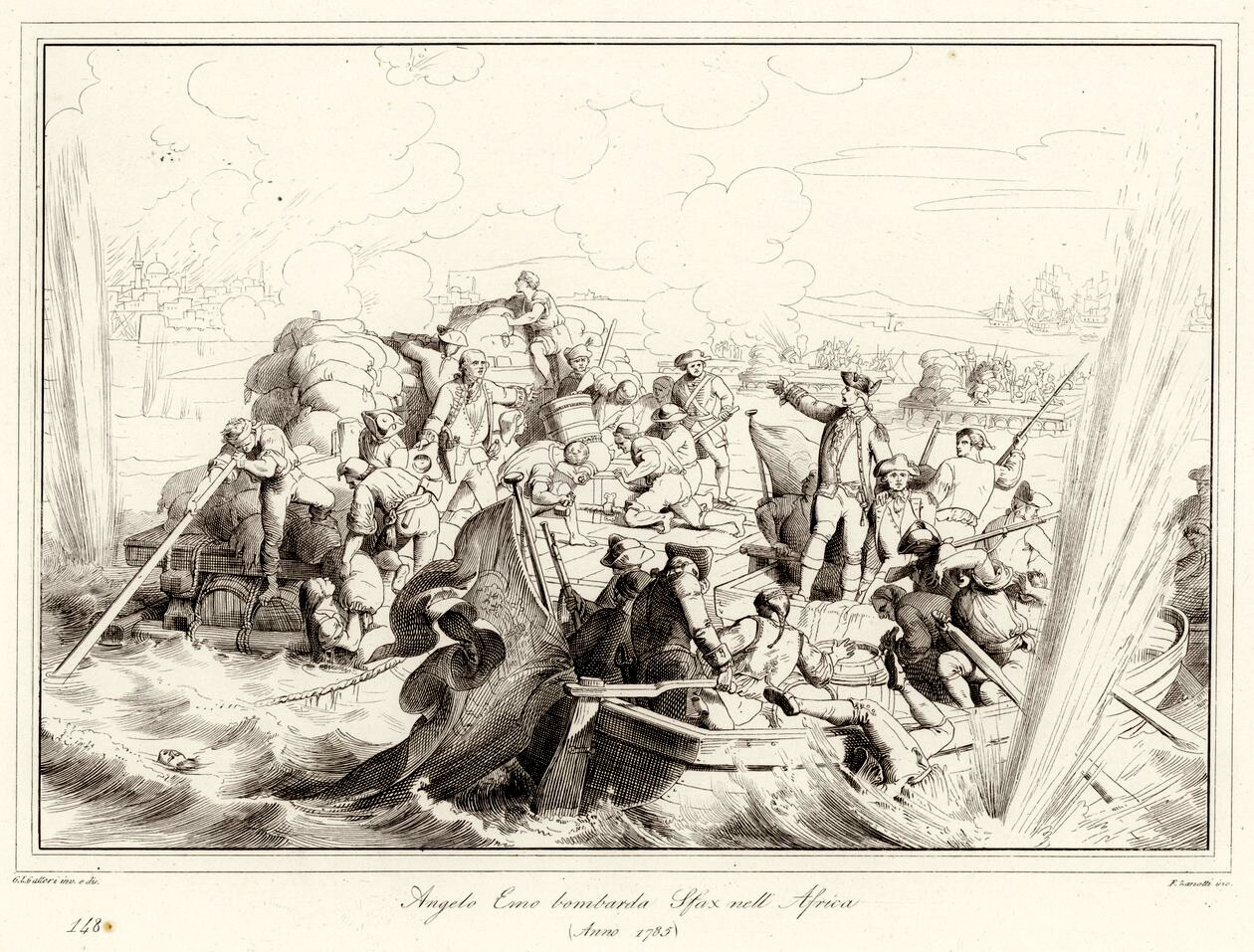
Angelo Emo bombards the city of Sfax with his floating batteries, from a drawing by Giuseppe Gatteri

Having found his rafts useful, Emo now prepared more of them, three to carry two guns each and six with a single gun. On 26 February 1786, he left Malta with his whole fleet except the Sirena, which had too many sick on board to be included, and on 12 March, after the usual delays caused by bad weather, he anchored off Sfax. The rafts were got ready, the boats of the Eolo and Vittoria were given their howitzers, and on the 18th the slow business of warping into position began. There was unexpectedly little water and it proved impossible for the bomb-vessels to get in as close as they had done in the previous year, but at last in the evening of 20 March it was possible to open fire. The results were unsatisfactory, but it was evident that high-angle fire with bombs was far more effective than direct fire with shot. Accordingly, Emo began a new raft to carry a large mortar, and at the same time converted two of his double rafts and one single for shell-fire.

Then came a long pause, due primarily to the resumption of correspondence with the Bey through the master of the same British ship as before, and afterwards to a long spell of bad weather. It was not until 29 April that it was possible to resume operations, but next morning and again in the morning of 4 May two intensive bombardments took place. After that all the rafts except that of the large mortar were taken to pieces and with a final effort from this and the two bomb-vessels in the evening of the 6th, the fleet prepared to depart.

=== Bizerta ===
It actually got under way on 8 May, but took several days to get clear of the Kerkennah Islands, and did not reach Malta until the 24th. As it did so, it met the Sirena returning to harbour with her foremast gone. After waiting for some time for stores from Corfu and money from Livorno, the fleet—still without the Sirena—put to sea again on 4 July, this time steering for Bizerta. As usual it made a slow passage and took twenty days for a distance, in a straight line, of less than 250 miles. On arrival eight rafts were prepared—two bombers, one double-howitzer and five with double guns—while there were two longboats with howitzers as before. The first bombardment in the early hours of 30 July was carried out by the bomb-vessels only, since the sea was too rough for the rafts. Emo described the result of the 46 bombs fired as "not very successful", but added that the 145 shots fired by the enemy were no more so, since only one achieved a hit—on the Polonia—and that did no permanent damage. Next night the two longboats opened the attack in the dark and the bomb-vessels joined in at dawn; this time the results were more satisfactory, and though the shore guns proved to have a surprisingly long range, the attackers suffered very little. 1 August was a bad day and it was necessary to remove the mortars from the rafts, but it was possible to renew the bombardment on the 3rd and 4th, with the gun-rafts also in action on the 4th. 6 August saw another attack in the early morning and a final effort by moonlight on the following night. After that the rafts were dismantled, and on the 10th the fleet left, going first to Favignana near Trapani for water and reaching Malta on 22 August.

=== Sousse ===
After only a short stay, Emo sailed again on 4 September with all his ships except the Cavalier Angelo, which was away at Livorno, and the Sirena, which was not yet ready for sea, though her new foremast had arrived from Venice on the 28th together with a quantity of ammunition and a large boat to carry another howitzer. Querini, who had been in the Sirena as Almirante or vice-admiral, left for home via Syracuse just as the fleet sailed. This time Sousse was to be attacked, and there the fleet arrived on 19 September, having met another storeship on the way and taken over another longboat from her. The rafts—six with guns and two with mortars—had been put together the day before and were now disposed with the bomb-vessels and the four shell-boats behind the intervals in the line of ships, to await a suitable moment for action.

The Sirena and Cavalier Angelo had just rejoined, but had been detached again as cruisers, the former to the northward, the latter to the south and south-east. Nothing could be done for a week, but in the evening of 26 September the rafts and small craft were got into position and that night and again on the next three nights, firing went on for two or three hours. There was very little reply from the shore, but the Distruzione had a good deal of trouble with her after mortar, which damaged its mounting on both of the last two nights. Two gun-rafts were now given mortars or howitzers and on 3 October the attack was resumed in bright moonlight, which enabled the shore guns to inflict some damage and cause a few casualties. After this the bomb-vessels were given a rest and the final bombardment on 5 October was carried out by the rafts and boats only.

In the night of 7 October the fleet withdrew. The bomb-vessels went straight to Malta and got there on the 14th, while the Sirena came in the same day and the Cavalier Angelo on the 19th, but the main body remained at sea for some days and did not arrive until 26 October. It stayed in harbour until 7 December, when Emo sailed with the Fama, Eolo, Concordia, Vittoria and Palma, but only to return on the 18th with the Concordia leaking badly. Meanwhile the Sirena and Cavalier Angelo had again been cruising independently, and the latter had had to go to Cephalonia and thence to Corfu for repairs. Tommaso Condulmer, elected Patron delle Navi, arrived on 27 December from Livorno to take the place of Querini, and on the following day he took the Sirena and Palma for a cruise on the Tunisian coast, returning to Malta on 9 January 1787. On 27 January, Condulmer left for a second cruise with the Sirena and Palma.

== End of active operations ==
These operations not only caused great damage and casualties in these cities, but also confined the Tunisian pirate fleet to its harbours. They also made Emo famous throughout Europe, where the images of his firework-like night bombardments kindled the imagination. At the same time, it was becoming evident that no amount of damage to outlying towns was likely to bring the Tunisian government to the negotiating table. Emo requested a 10,000-man expeditionary force with which to assault and capture Tunis, were rejected by the Venetian Senate. Venice, like the other European naval powers of the time, preferred to reach an agreement with the pirates, including the annual payments, than engage in the long, and far more costly, naval and land campaigns that would be necessary to root them out completely.

On the contrary, the Senate decided to leave only a small force to protect trade and pick up Tunisian prizes, if possible, and to recall the bulk of the fleet to waters nearer home. The reason for this move is not clear, but it may have been the knowledge that another war between Russia and the Ottomans was not far off and that this would probably involve fighting or at any rate disturbance in waters round the coasts of Greece. At any rate, Emo left Malta on 18 March 1787, and reached Corfu on 6 April. His two bomb-vessels had gone home already; they had sailed from Malta on 24 January and arrived at Venice on 21 March. Condulmer was left with only the Sirena and the two recently arrived "transport frigates", Pallade and Venere.

== Aftermath ==
Emo's departure effectively brought the conflict to its end. Condulmer remained on patrol for the next five years, until a peace agreement was reached in 1792, but his activity only resulted in the capture of some minor prizes, and in the forced inactivity of the Tunisian navy, which mostly remained in its ports.

At the end of 1787, Condulmer's squadron counted the Sirena, the Pallade, the light frigate Brillante, and the xebec Cupido. Over the next years, the Tunisians put some smaller craft out to sea, and Condulmer was provided with rowed galeots to deal with them. In late 1790, the Senate named Emo Provveditore Generale da Mar, but did not entrust him with leading the fleet against the Tunisian coast. With the French Revolution under way in Europe, the Senate was loath to become embroiled in a prolonged conflict, and preferred peace. The Senate feared that Emo's aggressive nature would hamper these efforts, and instead placed Condulmer, promoted to Capitano delle Navi, in charge of the peace negotiations.

In 1791, the Venetian government decided on a final show of force, reuniting the fleet of Emo with the squadron of Condulmer, now promoted to Almirante. The combined fleet met at Favignana in Sicily in August, comprising the first-rate battleships Vittoria (Condulmer's flagship), Eolo, San Giorgio, and Galatea, the heavy frigates Fama (Emo's flagship) and Minerva, the light frigates Palma, Brillante, Bellona, and Medusa, the transport frigates Pallade and Cavalier Angelo, three cutters, three schooners, two xebecs, nine galeots, and eight gunboats. Condulmer returned towards Tunis on 28 August and Emo followed early in September, to cruise on and off the Tunisian coasts with Favignana as his base, while negotiations about peace terms continued in fits and starts. On 1 December the whole fleet entered Malta for the winter and there Emo died, after a long illness, on 1 March.

== Sources ==
- Anderson, R. C. (1952). Naval Wars in the Levant 1559–1853. Princeton: Princeton University Press.
- Eickhoff, Ekkehard (2008). Venedig, spätes Feuerwerk. Glanz und Untergang der Republik, 1700–1797 [Venice's Late Firework. Splendor and Downfall of the Republic, 1700–1797] (in German) (3rd ed.). Stuttgart: Klett-Cotta. ISBN 978-3-608-94145-6.
- Mocenigo, Mario Nani (1935). Storia della marina veneziana: da Lepanto alla caduta della Repubblica [History of the Venetian navy: from Lepanto to the fall of the Republic] (in Italian). Rome: Tipo lit. Ministero della Marina – Uff. Gabinetto.
- Preto, Paolo (1993). "EMO, Angelo". Dizionario Biografico degli Italiani (in Italian). Vol. 42: Dugoni–Enza. Rome: Istituto dell'Enciclopedia Italiana. ISBN 978-88-12-00032-6.
- Giornale storico del viaggio in Africa della Veneta Squadra, comandata dall'eccell. kavaliere, e procurator di San Marco, il signor Angelo Emo [Historical Journal of the Voyage to Africa of the Venetian Squadron, Commanded by the Excell. Knight, and Procurator of Saint Mark, the Lord Angelo Emo] (in Italian). Venice: Giambatista Novelli. 1787.
