= Battle of Samothrace (1698) =

Last significant battle of the Great Turkish War

- Part of the Sixth Ottoman–Venetian War and the War of the Holy League
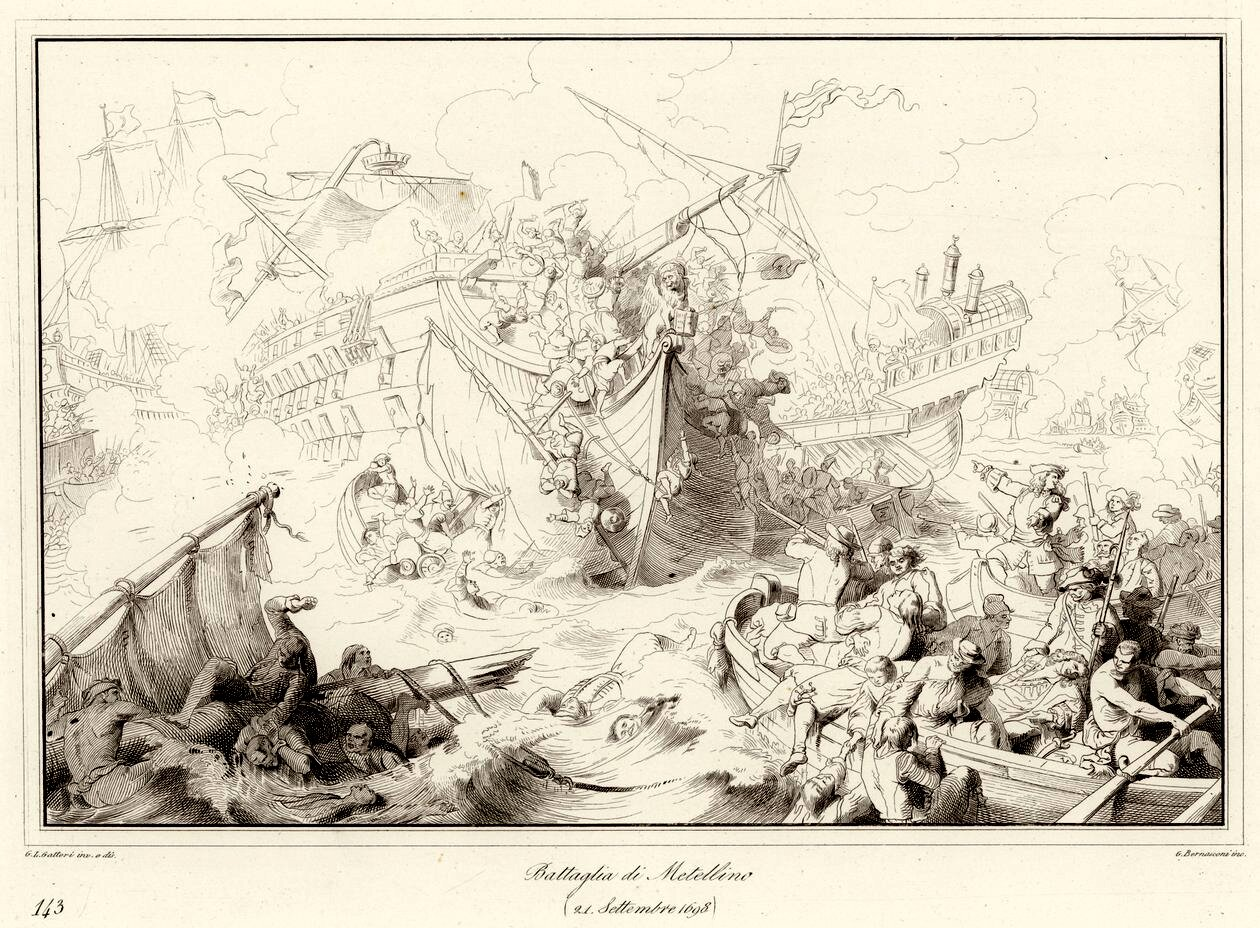
- Sketch of the battle around the dismasted Rizzo d'Oro, by Giuseppe Lorenzo Gatteri
Date	September 20, 1698
Location	near Samothrace in the northern Aegean Sea
Result	Inconclusive

Belligerents
Republic of Venice	Ottoman Empire: Tripolitania; Tunis

Strength
20 Venetian ships	25 Ottoman ships 7 Tripolitanian and Tunisian vessels

Casualties and losses
299 killed 622 wounded	Unknown

The Battle of Samothrace was an inconclusive battle which took place on 20 September 1698 near the island of Samothrace, during the Sixth Ottoman–Venetian War. It was fought between Venice on one side, and the Ottoman Empire with its Tripolitanian and Tunisian vassals on the other. Venetian casualties were 299 killed and 622 wounded. Although it resulted in a stalemate, the Battle of Samothrace is notable as the last significant battle of the Great Turkish War.

== Background ==
The Venetian fleet, headed by a new Captain General of the Sea, Giacomo Corner, along with the Capitano Straordinario delle Navi Piero Duodo and the Provveditore Generale da Mar Daniele Dolfin, sailed from its base at Nauplia on 13 June 1698. It comprised 27 sailing ships and 3 fireships but no galleys, as a result of which Dolfin, who normally would have headed the galleys, was placed in charge of the sailing fleet. Aiming to bring the Ottoman fleet to battle as soon as possible, the fleet made for the northern Aegean.

The Venetians raided Lemnos on 26 June before making for Imbros, where the galleys joined the rest of the fleet in anchorage, but it was not until 17 July that the first Ottoman ships were spotted at the mouth of the Dardanelles. The Ottomans made no moves towards the Venetian fleet, so that the latter left Imbros on 1 August and anchored in front of the Dardanelles. Thereupon the Ottomans raised anchor and moved to towards the Venetians, but remained mostly out of range and no engagement ensued, before the Ottoman ships anchored at Tenedos. Similar manoeuvres followed on the following days, as the Ottomans moved towards Imbros, the Venetians closing in, only for both sides to then return to their initial positions. On 16 July Dolfin, sailing before a favourable north wind, chased the Turks back into the Dardanelles; in their haste, the latter wrecked and torched the flagship of the Tripolitanian squadron and had another ship dismasted. On 13 August the Venetians' allies (Maltese, Papal, and Tuscan galley squadrons) joined them at Imbros, but on 25 July the entire galley force, which had remained idle, left Imbros for Poros. Two days later, the Venetian sailing fleet left for Samothrace.

== Battle ==
On 18 August the Venetian and Ottoman fleets sighted each other off Samothrace, with the Ottomans to windward. The two fleets manoeuvred for the weather gauge, until, on the morning of 20 September, the Ottomans had come up to windward of the Venetian rear. Dolfin resolved to attack by tacking his ships at 15:00, whereupon the combat commenced in a disorderly melée. The Venetians had 20 ships, while the Ottomans 25, along with seven Tripolitanian and Tunisian ones in reserve.

Dolfin's flagship, Rizzo d'Oro, was run into by the San Lorenzo Giustinian, lost her mizzen yard and was left among the Ottoman fleet, but was later recovered by the intervention of the two other Venetian flagships, Duodo's Aurora and Bonvicini's Aquila Valiera. The stearing gear of the Amazzone, which led the Venetian line of battle, was disabled, and she was also for a while surrounded by Ottoman fleets. The battle ended at dusk, without a clear winner: the Venetians lost 299 killed and 622 wounded, of whom 301 had been on the Rizzo d'Oro.

== Aftermath ==
After the battle, the Ottomans retired to the ports of Focchies and Smyrna. The Venetians continued to cruise in the northeastern Aegean in hope of another battle, but in vain, as the Ottomans remained put. In October, Dolfin returned with the sailing ships to Nauplia, marking the end of the campaign.

== Opposing forces ==
=== Venice ===
- Rizzo d'Oro - Damaged
- Amazzone Guerriera
- Aquila Valiera c.70
- San Lorenzo Giustinian c.70
- 16 other ships

=== Ottomans ===
- 25 Ottoman ships
- 7 Tripolitanian and Tunisian vessels

== Sources ==
- Anderson, R. C. (1952). Naval Wars in the Levant 1559–1853. Princeton: Princeton University Press.
