= New Fortress =

Venetian fortress

- Νέο Φρούριο
- Part of the defences of Corfu City
- Corfu, Greece
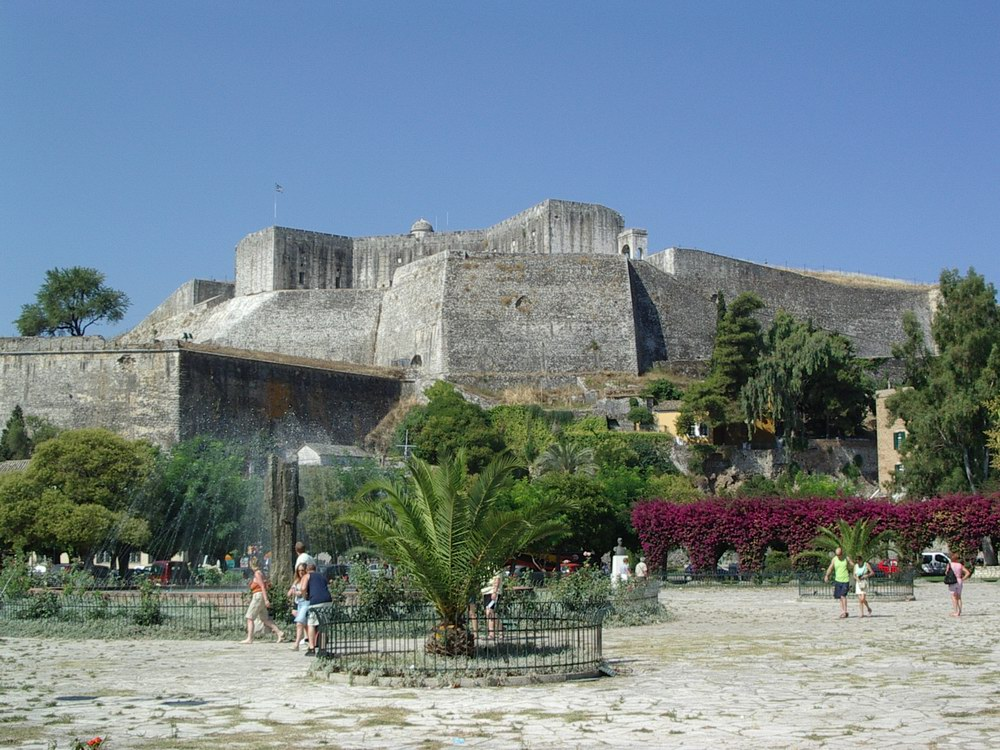
- New Fortress, view from old port (north-east)

Site information
- Owner: Greece Greek Ministry of Culture
- Controlled by: Republic of Venice 1572–1797; Corcyre 1797–1800; Septinsular Republic 1800–1807; First French Empire 1807–14; United States of the Ionian Islands 1815–64; Greece c. 1864
- Open to the public: Yes

Location
- Coordinates: 39.6254°N 19.9168°E

Site history
- Built: 1572–post 1728
- Built by: Unknown
- Materials: hewn stone (ashlar)
- Battles/wars: Siege of Corfu (1798–99); Corfu incident (1923)

The New Fortress of Corfu (Greek: Νέο Φρούριο; Venetian: Fortezza Nuova) is a Venetian fortress built on the hill of St. Mark in Corfu in stages. The original architect of the fort was the military engineer Ferrante Vitelli. The current buildings which exist within the fortress were built by the British during their rule of the island (1815–63).

At the top of the castle there is a stone building which was used for defence and a brick building which in modern times functions as the headquarters of the Naval Station of Corfu. The Venetian fortifications were later expanded by the British and the French to help defend against a possible Turkish attack. Its fortifications included 700 pieces of artillery with range estimated as far as the Albanian coast.

== Origins ==
1688 diagram of the New Fortress, with later additions shown in colours: red: fort; green: Skarponas Bastion 1728; yellow: Venetian mural monuments

In the aftermath of the first great Ottoman siege of Corfu in 1537, the Venetians developed plans to expand the fortifications of the city.

Furthermore, due to the great civilian losses, the Corfu city council sent diplomatic representatives to Venice complaining about the lack of fortifications for the parts of the city of Corfu lying outside the walls of the medieval citadel. In response, the Venetians proceeded with works to build walls and fortifications to strengthen the defences of the wider town lying outside the walls of the old citadel.

To achieve their goals the Venetians razed 2,000 homes in the suburb of San Rocco, and built new fortifications and walls in their place at great expense. After the fortification works were completed the Venetians built the New Fortress at the hill of St. Mark to further strengthen the defences of the outer city of Corfu and to act as the focal point of the new fortifications. The exact dating of the structure is not established but accounts vary between 1576 or 1577–1588, and 1572–1645. The start date for the construction is also reported as 1577 by Corfiote historian Katsaros. The works had also the effect of widening the defensive perimeter of the old citadel lying inside the Old Fortress.

== Architectural details ==
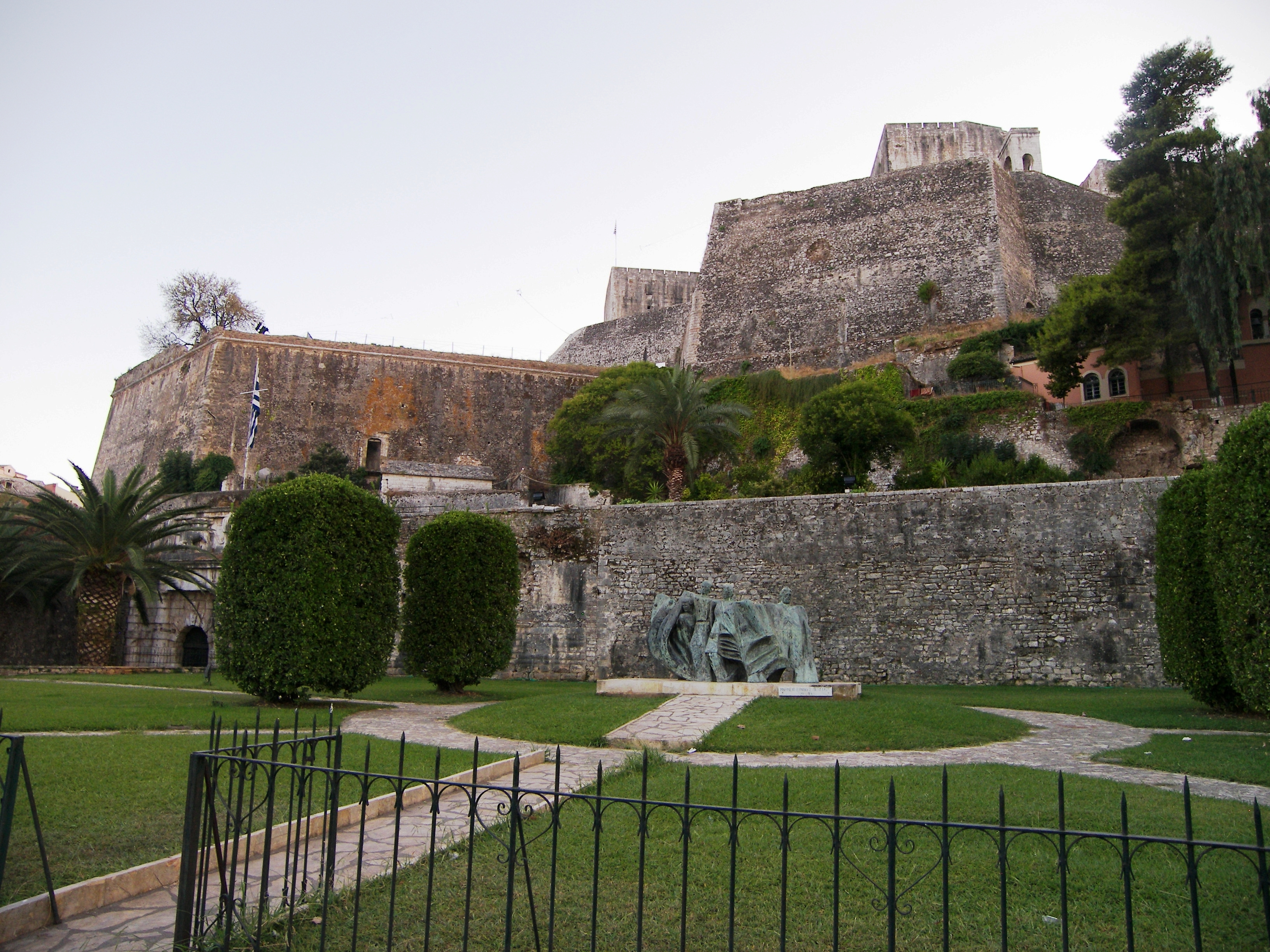
New Fortress viewed from north-west

The Fortress compound is divided into two levels. In the lower level there is a three-storey building called "Punta Perpetua" and a bastion of pentagonal shape.

Inside the bastion there is a maze of arched chambers, galleries, ventilation shafts, stairs and ramps. The fortress has two baroque-styled gates. Its western side features a dry moat which spans the length of the walls, running from the vegetable market to the new harbour. The moat is a good example of moat architecture.

The structure features twin bastions, named Skarponas and Epta Anemoi ("Seven Winds"), which has a commanding view of the sea and the mountains of mainland Greece. Below the bastion there is a building which was built by the British and functioned as military barracks. Nowadays it houses art exhibits and collections as well as space for social events.

The bastion is at a height of 55 m above sea level and features structures such as underground cisterns, powder magazines, artillery positions and underground halls.

== Governor of the castle ==
The governors of the Old and New Fortresses were elected by the Venetian Senate for a period of two years. Both captains were sworn before the Senate and part of their oath was to never communicate with each other during their two-year tenure as governors of the fortresses. This was for security reasons in case one captain could persuade the other to commit treason against the Republic. Nikola Alačević was appointed as captain of the new fortress in 1744 and died on Corfu in 1746.

== Mural monuments ==
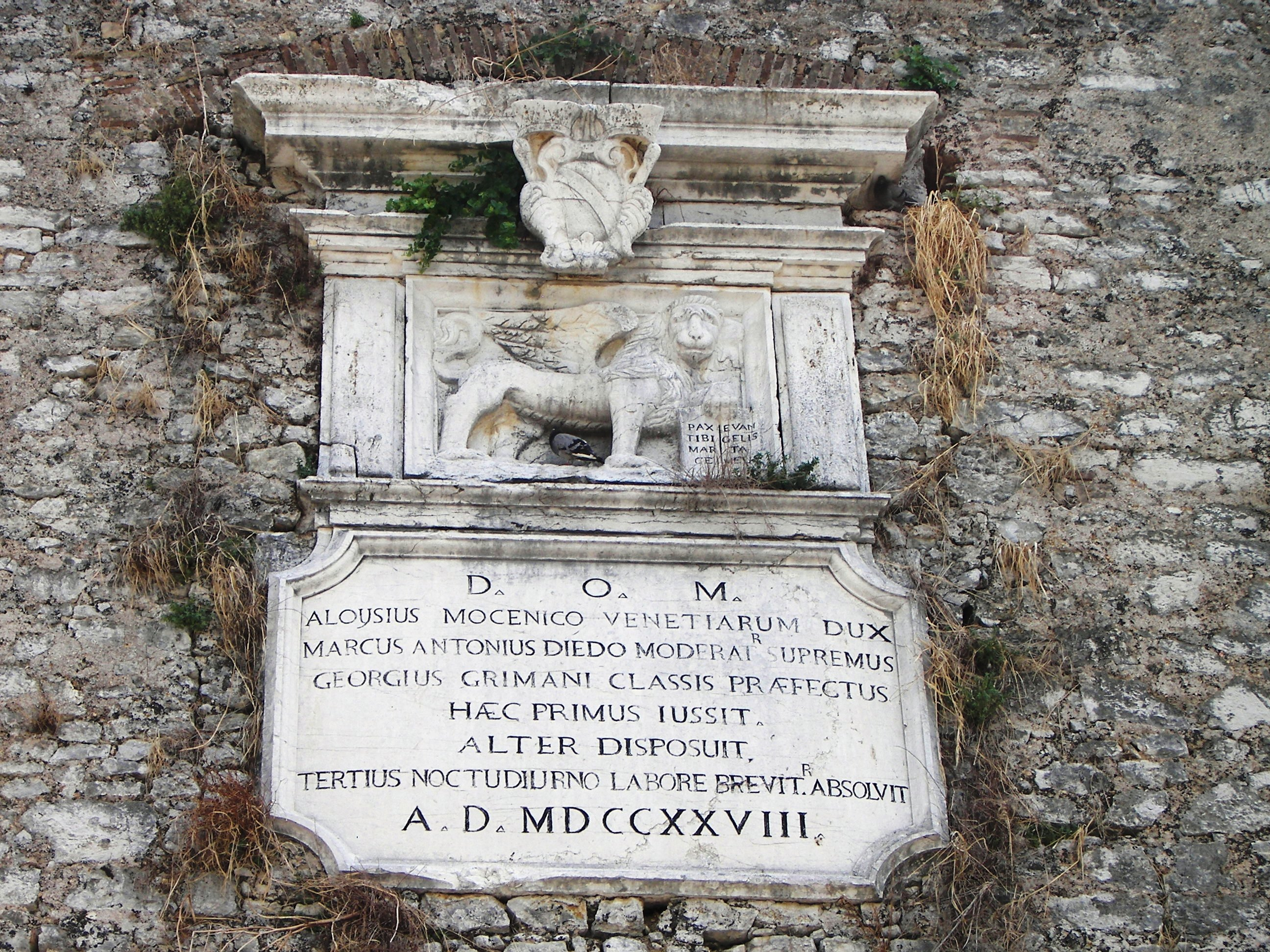
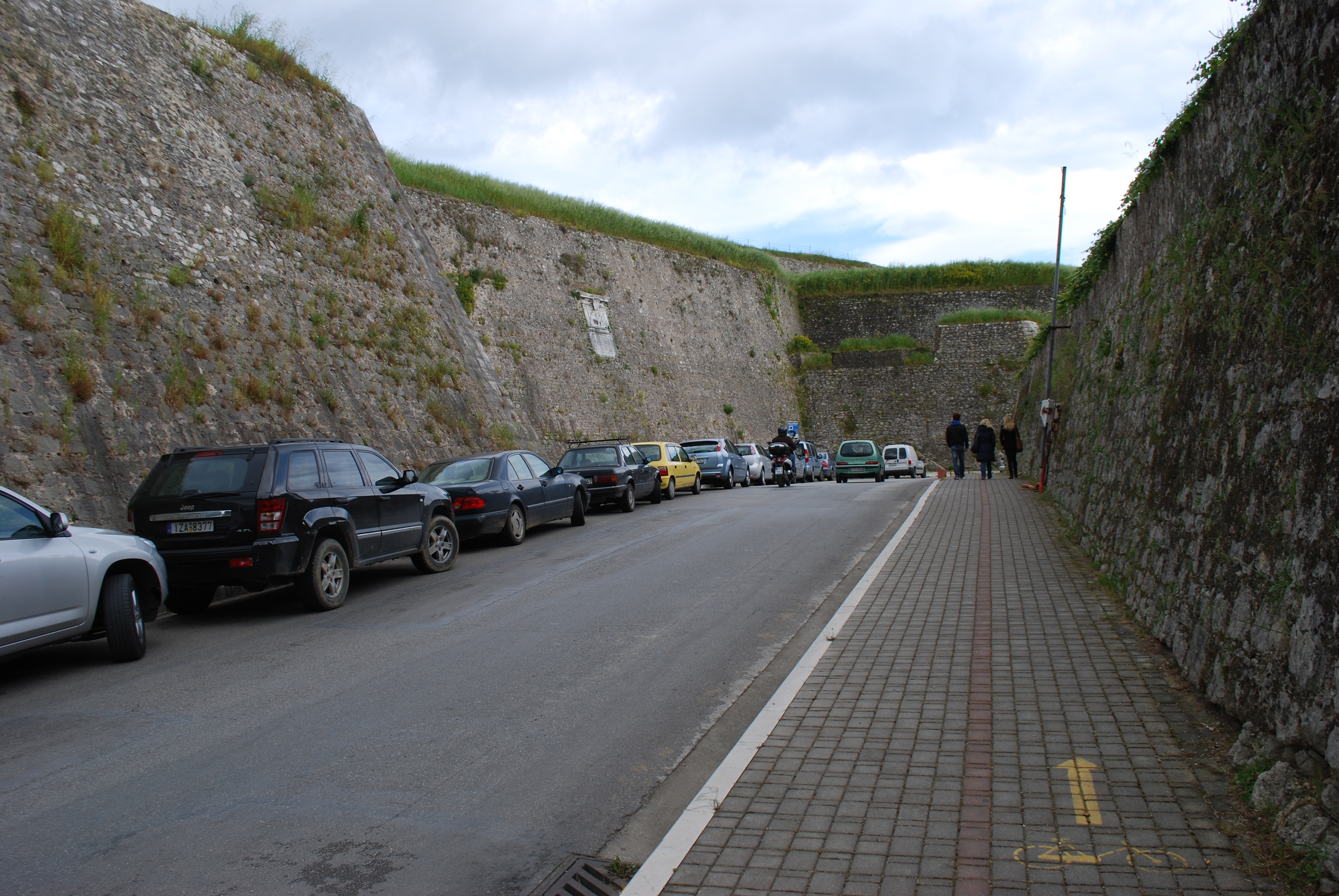
1728 Venetian monument affixed to the Skarponas Rampart of the defensive wall of the New Fortress of Corfu Town, then governed by Marco Antonio Diedo, ordered to be built by Alvise III Sebastiano Mocenigo (1662–1732), Doge of Venice

At least two inscribed monuments survive affixed to the rampart walls, the best preserved of which is one from 1728. It displays the Lion of Saint Mark (the symbol of Venice) and the arms of Diedo below which is the following Latin inscription:

D(eo) O(ptimo) M(aximo)
Aloysius Mocenico Venetiarum Dux
Marcus Antonius Diedo Moderat(o)r Supremus
Georgius Grimani Classis Praefectus
Haec Primus Jussit
Alter Disposuit
Tertius Noctudiurno Labore Brevit(e)r Absolvit
AD MDCCXXVIII

("To God, the most good and greatest, Alvise III Mocenigo, Duke of the Venetians (i.e. Doge of Venice); Marco Antonio Diedo, Supreme Governor, Giorgio Grimani, Commander of the Fleet; the first ordered this (i.e. the wall); the second planned it; the third, by labour day and night, quickly completed it, in the year of our Lord 1728").

== Destruction of fortifications ==
The sea defences of the New Fortress were destroyed by the British when the British protectorate came to an end and Corfu was united with Greece in 1864. Under the same agreement, the Avrami and Vido island forts were also destroyed. When the latter fort was demolished, the explosion was so strong that it broke house windows on the Corfu side of the sea channel.

== Bombardment ==
In 1923 the New and Old Fortresses were bombarded by the Italian Air Force during the Corfu Incident. Greek refugees from Asia Minor were sheltered inside the New Fort at the time but there were no casualties.
