= Lodovico Flangini =

Venetian noble

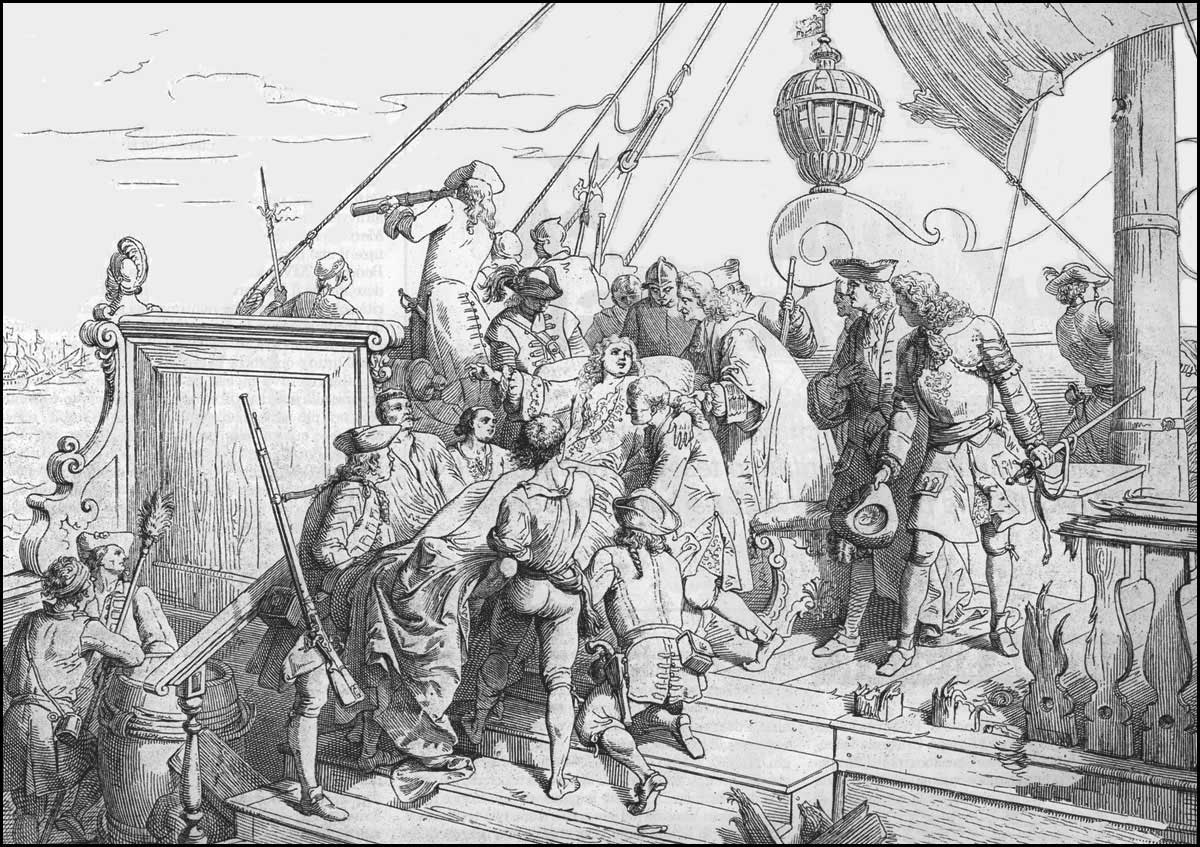
- The death of Flangini on board the Leon Trionfante, drawing by Giuseppe Gatteri
- Born: 1677; Venice
- Died: 22 June 1717 (aged 39–40)
- Military career
- Allegiance: Republic of Venice (1696–1718)
- Branch: Venetian navy
- Rank: Capitano Straordinario delle Navi
- Conflicts: Morean War, Seventh Ottoman–Venetian War

Lodovico Flangini (Venice, 1677 – 22 June 1717) was a Venetian noble who served as Capitano Straordinario delle Navi (commander of the sailing fleet) during the Seventh Ottoman–Venetian War.

== Biography ==
Lodovico Flangini was born in Venice in 1677 to a noble family of the Venetian patriciate, the third son of Girolamo, a Senator and member of the Council of Ten. Already as a youth he enlisted in the Venetian navy and participated in the War of the Morea in 1696–1697 as a ship of the line captain (Governator di Nave) under the provveditore Grimani.

He was then elected as provveditore straordinario di Terraferma at Orzinuovi in 1701, at Brescia in 1704, and at Bergamo in 1706.

In 1717, during the Seventh Ottoman–Venetian War, he was appointed Capitano Straordinario delle Navi (commander of the sailing fleet), replacing Andrea Corner. He thus took over command of 28 ships of the line in three divisions (Red, Yellow, and Blue), 18 galleys, 2 galleasses, 10 galliots, 4 fireships, and 2 corvettes. In addition, Venice's allies in the Holy League provided 7 Portuguese, 5 Papal, and 4 Maltese ships of the line, as well as 5 Spanish, 4 Papal, 3 Maltese, 2 Tuscan, and 2 Genoese galleys. Flangini hoisted his ensign on the newly built 70-cannon battleship Leon Trionfante, and on 12 May scored a partial victory at the Battle of Imbros, in which he forced the Ottoman fleet of 42 ships to retreat.

Four days later, the two fleets met again in the sea between Mount Athos and the island of Agios Efstratios, and in the ensuing battle, the Venetians defeated the Ottomans. Six Ottoman ships of the line were badly damaged, and the Ottoman fleet suffered 2,500 killed or wounded. As the Ottoman fleet began its retreat, a musket ball hit Flangini in the neck. Heavily wounded, he sailed to Thermia (Kythnos), but again led the Venetian fleet in battle on 22 June, directing the action from the deck of his flagship until he collapsed and died. His final words were reportedly "Verdè, San Marco ne aiuta".

His body was transported to Venice, where his funeral took place. His brother Constantino received the title of a Knight of the Order of the Golden Stole in his stead. The poet and musician Benedetto Marcello composed an ode in his honour, Corona Poetica in Morte di S.E. Lodovico Flangini, Fù Capitano Estraordinario delle Navi.

== Sources ==
- Candiani, Guido Candiani (2009). I vascelli della Serenissima: guerra, politica e costruzioni navali a Venezia in età moderna, 1650-1720 (in Italian). Venezia: Istituto Veneto di Scienze, Lettere e Arti.
- Candiani, Guido (2012). Dalla galea alla nave di linea: le trasformazioni della marina veneziana (1572-1699) (in Italian). Novi Ligure: Città del Silenzio.
- Ercole, Guido (2006). Duri i banchi. Le navi della Serenissima 421-1797 (in Italian). Gardolo: Gruppo Modellismo Trentino di studio e ricerca storica.
- Scapini Flangini, Gualtiero (2012). Il Leone Trionfante. Ravenna: SBC Edizioni.
- Flangini, Yamandú; Scapini Flangini, Gualtiero (2015). Flangini. Gli stretti legami di una famiglia di Greci e la Repubblica di San Marco. Montevideo: Y. Flangini. ISBN 978-6-05035-448-5.
- Garzoni, Pietro (1716). Istoria della Repubblica di Venezia in tempo della Sacra Lega. Vol.2. Venezia: Appresso Gio Manfrè.
- Garzoni, Pietro (1720). Istoria della Repubblica di Venezia in tempo della Sacra Lega. Vol.1. Venezia: Appresso Gio Manfrè.
- Levi, Cesare Augusto (1896). Navi da guerra costruite nell'Arsenale di Venezia dal 1664 al 1896 (in Italian). Venezia: Stabilimento Tipografico Fratelli Visentini.
