= Daniele Girolamo Dolfin =

Venetian statesman and military commander

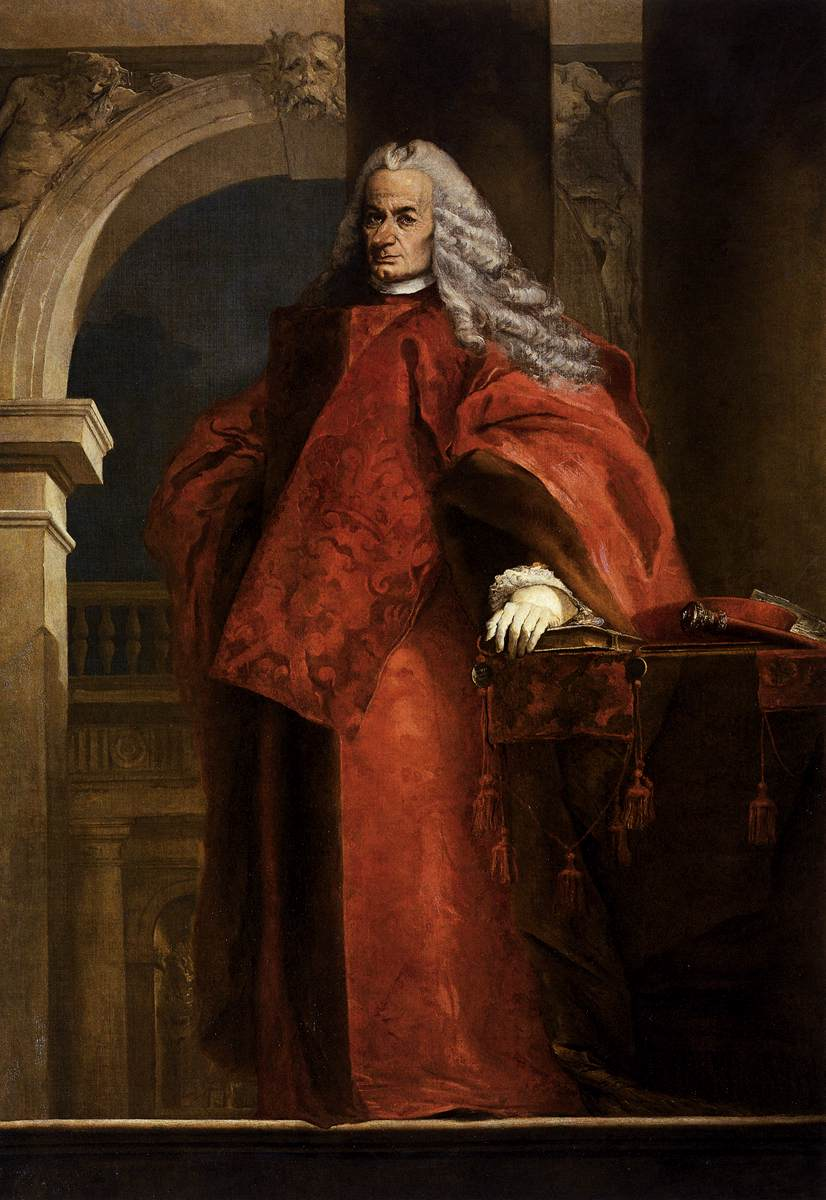
Daniele Dolfin, portrait by Giambattista Tiepolo

Daniele Girolamo Dolfin or Daniele IV Dolfin (1656 – 14 April 1729) was a Venetian statesman and military commander. He participated in the Morean War during the siege of Athens, the Battle of Mytilene, where he was heavily wounded, and the Battle of Samothrace, the last battle of the war. After the war he served as governor-general of the Venetian Ionian Islands (1699) and of the Terraferma (1706) and envoy extraordinary to Emperor Leopold I (1700). During the first phase of the Second Morean War he was Provveditore Generale da Mar, but was replaced after failing to prevent the loss of the Morea. His final appointment was as ambassador to Poland.

He was known as "Girolamo" to distinguish him from his namesake brothers, Daniele Marco Dolfin (1653–1704) and Daniele Giovanni Dolfin (1654–1729). Dolfin lost his left hand during the 1690 battle of Mytilene.

== Sources ==
- Benzoni, Gino (1991). "DOLFIN, Daniele". Dizionario Biografico degli Italiani (in Italian). Vol. 40: Di Fausto–Donadoni. Rome: Istituto dell'Enciclopedia Italiana. ISBN 978-88-12-00032-6.
- Benzoni, Gino (1991). "DOLFIN, Daniele". Dizionario Biografico degli Italiani (in Italian). Vol. 40: Di Fausto–Donadoni. Rome: Istituto dell'Enciclopedia Italiana. ISBN 978-88-12-00032-6.
