= Condulmer family =

Venetian patrician family

Coat of arms of the Condulmer family

The Condulmer were a Venetian family originally from Pavia. Originally wealthy commoners, the different branches of the family were only slowly admitted to the Venetian nobility. Marco Condulmer, a bread merchant, is recorded in 1297. In 1381, Jacopo Condulmer of the Domenico branch was ennobled for his contributions to the treasury during the War of Chioggia in 1379. The Fernovelli branch was ennobled with the election of one of its own, Gabriele, as Pope Eugene IV in 1431. Still, in 1528, Zuan Francesco Condulmer had his name crossed out in the Libro d'Oro for his failure to prove his nobility. A third branch of the family, the Angelo, was ennobled only at the time of the Cretan War (1645–1669).

== Notable members ==
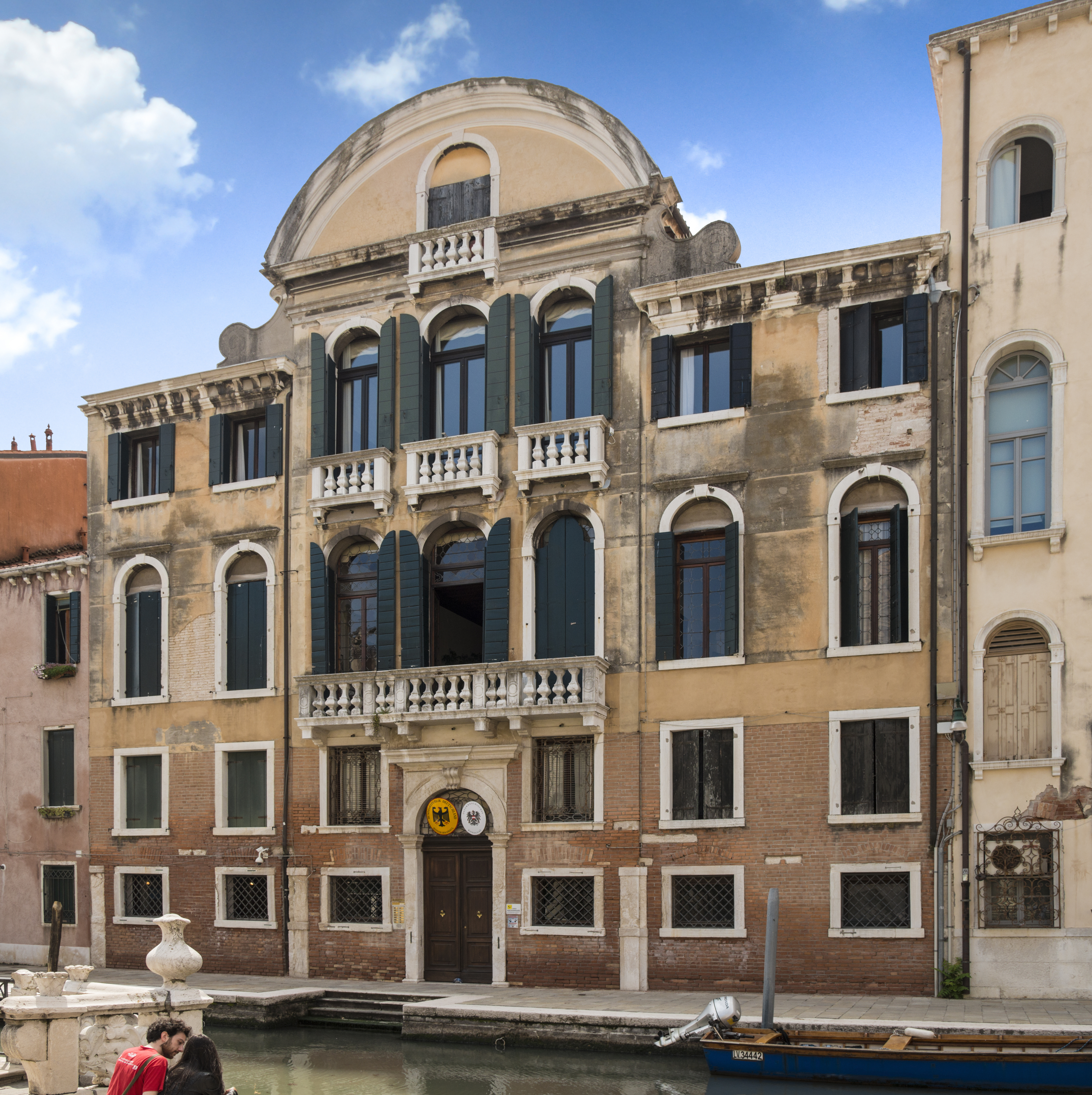
The Palazzo Condulmer in Venice

- Angelo Condulmer, founded the hospital of Sant'Agnesina in 1383, father of Gabriele
- Polissena Condulmer, married a Barbo, mother of Paolo Barbo and Pietro Barbo (Pope Paul II, 1417–1471)
- Gabriele Condulmer (1383–1447), served as Pope Eugene IV from 1431
- Francesco Condulmer (1390–1453), cardinal
- Marco Condulmer (1405/8–1460/5), bishop and patriarch
- Antonio Condulmer (1452–1528), politician and diplomat
- Elisabetta Condulmer (died 1538), courtesan
- Giovanni Francesco Condulmer, podestà of Oderzo in 1577
- Tommaso Condulmer (1759–1823), naval officer

== See also ==
- Villa Condulmer
