= Canım Hoca Mehmed Pasha =

18th-century Ottoman naval officer

Canım Hoca Mehmed Pasha (also known as Canum Hoca in European sources) was an 18th-century Ottoman admiral of Greek origin who served three times as Kapudan Pasha (grand admiral of the Ottoman Navy).

Originally a Greek Muslim from the fortress town of Koroni in the southwestern Peloponnese (in southern Greece), Canım Hoca Mehmed was captured by the Venetians during the Morean War (1684–1699) and served seven years as a galley slave in the Venetian fleet, until ransomed for 100 gold ducats.

He began his first term as Kapudan Pasha in December 1714, upon the outbreak of the war with Venice. He distinguished himself in this war through the capture of Tinos, as well as for his humane treatment of the Venetian captives taken during the Ottoman reconquest of the Morea, in stark contrast to the brutal behaviour of the Grand Vizier, Silahdar Damat Ali Pasha. In a battle fought on 8 July 1716, he led the Ottoman fleet in a failed attempt to capture Corfu, the chief of the Ionian Islands, then under Venetian rule.

Dismissed from his post in February 1717, he regained it for a few days in 1730, and became once more Kapudan Pasha in 1732, holding the post until 1736.

== Sources ==
- Setton, Kenneth Meyer (1991). Venice, Austria, and the Turks in the Seventeenth Century. Philadelphia, Mass.: The American Philosophical Society. ISBN 0-87169-192-2. ISSN 0065-9738.
