= Venetian ship Forza =

Venetian ship of the line

Forza was a first-rank ship of the line of the Venetian navy, serving from 1774 to 1784, although it was originally laid down in 1719.

Forza was laid down in April 1719 as part of the initial series of the Leon Trionfante class. Her chief architect, Francesco Da Ponte, fled to Russia to seek employment in the new Russian fleet, and her construction was entrusted to another, unknown, architect. With the end of the Ottoman–Venetian Wars after 1718, naval construction was largely suspended and Forza was only completed to 75% ('18 carats' in Venetian nomenclature) and mothballed in the Arsenal of Venice. She was completed to 87.5% ('21 carats') between 1740 and 1746, but not finished until February 1774, under the auspices of Pietro Paresi. With 55 years, she holds the record for length of time between being laid down and completed at the Arsenal of Venice.

When finished, Forza had a length of slightly over 49.5 metres (162 ft), a displacement of c. 1800 tons, and armed with 70 cannon, although normally, in peacetime, she only carried 66 (28x40-pounders, 26x20-pounders, 12x14-pounders). She entered service in May 1774 under Iseppo Stalimene. She returned to the Arsenal for repairs in November 1782 – April 1783. In June 1784 she was part of the fleet sent against the Beylik of Tunis under Angelo Emo. She served as the flagship of the Almirante (vice admiral of the Venetian sailing fleet) Giovanni Moro.

Forza was sunk at Trapani on 5 November 1784 as a result of bad weather, as her captain, Giuseppe Ballovich, ran her aground on some rocks. The loss of life was small, but included the Almirante Giovanni Moro.

== Sources ==
- Anderson, R. C. (1952). Naval Wars in the Levant 1559–1853. Princeton: Princeton University Press.
- Ercole, Guido (2011). Vascelli e fregate della Serenissima: Navi di linea della Marina veneziana 1652-1797 [Ships of the Line and Frigates of the Serenissima: Ships of the Line in the Venetian Navy 1652-1797] (in Italian). Trento: Gruppo Modellistico Trentino. ISBN 978-88-90565-14-4.
- Ercole, Guido (2022). Angelo Emo e Jacopo Nani. I due ammiragli che cercarono di salvare Venezia [Angelo Emo and Jacopo Nani. The Two Admirals Who Tried to Save Venice] (in Italian). Trento: Gruppo Modellistico Trentino. ISBN 978-88-98631-20-9.
- Nani Mocenigo, Mario (1935). Storia della marina veneziana: da Lepanto alla caduta della Repubblica [History of the Venetian Navy: from Lepanto to the Fall of the Republic] (in Italian). Rome: Tipo lit. Ministero della Marina – Uff. Gabinetto.
