= Battle of Mytilene (1690) =

Battle of the Great Turkish War

- Part of the Great Turkish War and the Morean War
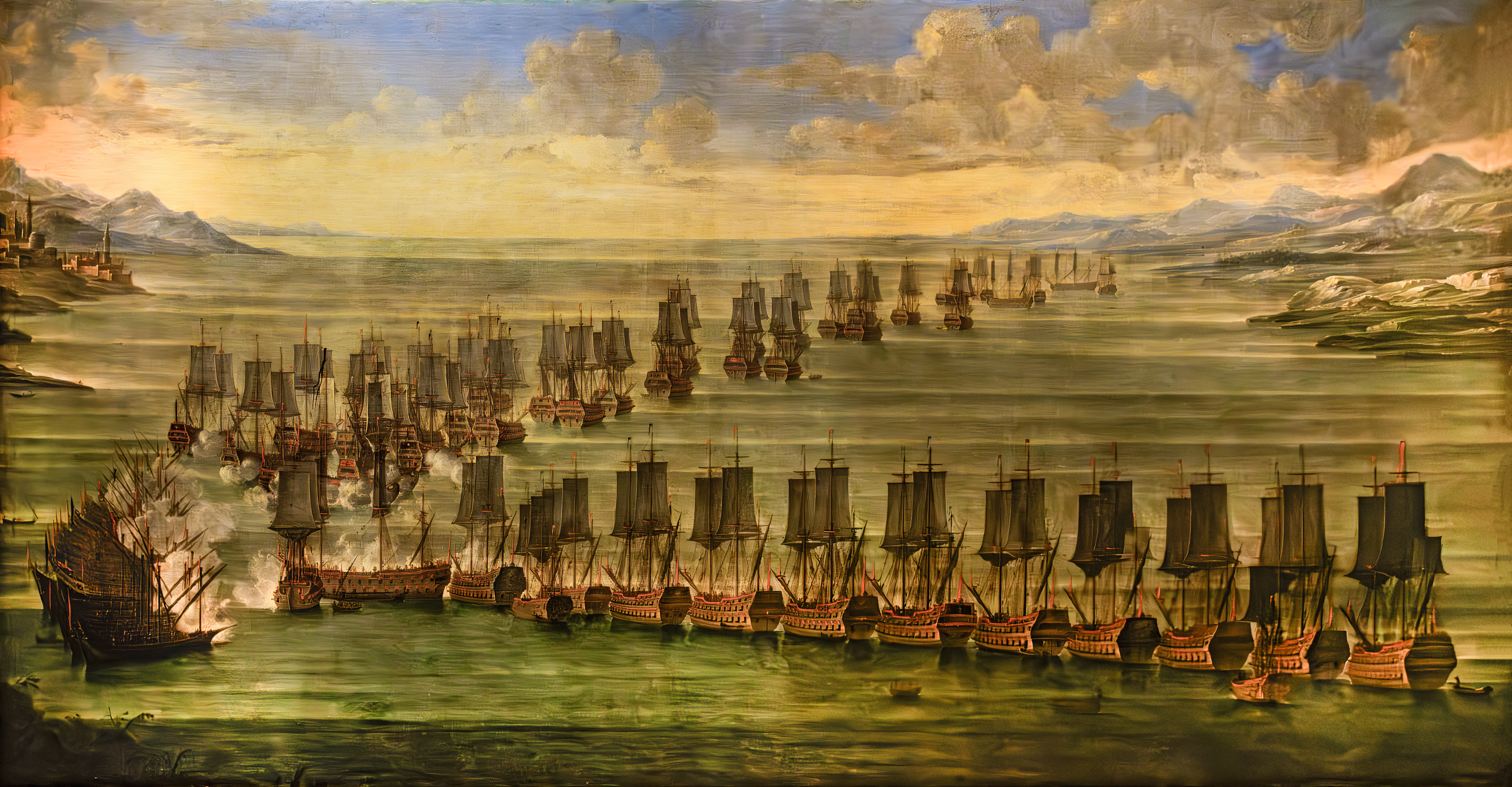
- Anonymous painting of the battle, now in the Museo Correr
Date	8 September 1690
Location	Mytilene, Ottoman Empire 39°6′N 26°33′E
Result	Venetian victory

Belligerents
Republic of Venice	Ottoman Empire; Deylik of Algiers; Beylik of Tunis; Pashalik of Tripoli

Commanders and leaders
Daniele Dolfin (WIA); Giovanni Buggie †	Unknown

Strength
12 sailing ships	9 sailing ships 23 galleys

Casualties and losses
12–20 killed Redentor del Mondo damaged	At most 300 killed 3 ships damaged or destroyed
- Location of the battle in present day Greece

The Battle of Mytilene was a naval battle that occurred on 8 September 1690 at Mytilene between a Venetian fleet under Daniele Dolfin and a combined Muslim fleet made up of Ottoman and Barbary ships. The battle resulted in a victory for the Venetian naval forces. This defeat inspired Suleiman II to end Ottoman reliance on Barbary pirates.

== Prelude ==
Shortly after taking command of the port of Monemvasia, Capitano Straordinario delle Navi Daniele Dolfin took the twelve largest sailing ships into the Aegean. After dropping off supplies in Tinos he sailed to Euboea in order to alarm the local Ottoman forces and prevent them from sending troops to the Isthmus of Corinth. After this he would set sail for Lesbos. On 7 September 1690 he arrived in Mytilene where he witnessed the Muslim fleet crossing between Lesbos and Foça, but couldn't attack due to unfavorable winds.

== Battle ==
Taking advantage of the wind, the Redentor, the Sacra Lega and the San Domenico attacked the Ottoman and North African flagships on the morning of 8 September 1690. Around 11:00 both sides started exchanging cannon fire; however, a calm in the wind left the Venetian ships unsupported. For four hours the three ships were isolated from the rest of the fleet and faced heavy fire from the Muslim fleet. During this exchange the Tripolitanian flagship took heavy damage from the Redentor and was towed off the line by the galleys. After the calm in the wind ended the other Venetian sail ships were able to form a line and the two fleets exchanged fire until 17:00 when Dolfin disengaged. After this the Muslim fleet returned to port in Mytilene.

During the battle, the Redentor received the brunt of the cannon fire with approximately 100 cannon shots between the hull and sails and the majority of the casualties. Among these casualties was Admiral Giovanni Buggie who was struck in the leg by a cannonball and would later die of gangrene on 12 September. Dolfin was also among those injured in the fighting, losing his left hand.

Ottoman casualties were significantly heavier than those of the Venetians. The Muslim fleet made up only 29 of the 32 ships suggesting that three of the Muslim ships were heavily damaged in the battle and had to remain in port. Of these three ships it is estimated that no more than 2 galleys were sunk.

== Aftermath ==
On 9–10 September both fleets came into sight of each other but did not engage one another. On 11 September the Muslim fleet withdrew to Foça and the Venetian fleet sailed back towards Morea.

The experience of the Ottomans at Mytilene enraged Suleiman II, who blamed the defeat on the cowardice of the Barbary corsairs. After the battle Suleiman began building sailing warships in an attempt to end the Ottoman Navy's reliance on the support of the Barbary pirates. This change in naval policy was continued by Suleiman's successor, Ahmed II and by 1694 the Ottoman navy had 20 ships of the line.
