= Marcantonio Diedo =

18th century naval officer from Venice

Marcantonio Diedo or Marco Antonio Diedo was a Venetian naval commander who served as Provveditore Generale da Mar in 1728–31. He served as commander of the Venetian fleet (Capitano delle Navi) in the Battle of Imbros (June 1717) and Battle of Matapan (July 1717) against the Ottoman fleet.

== Mural monument in Corfu ==
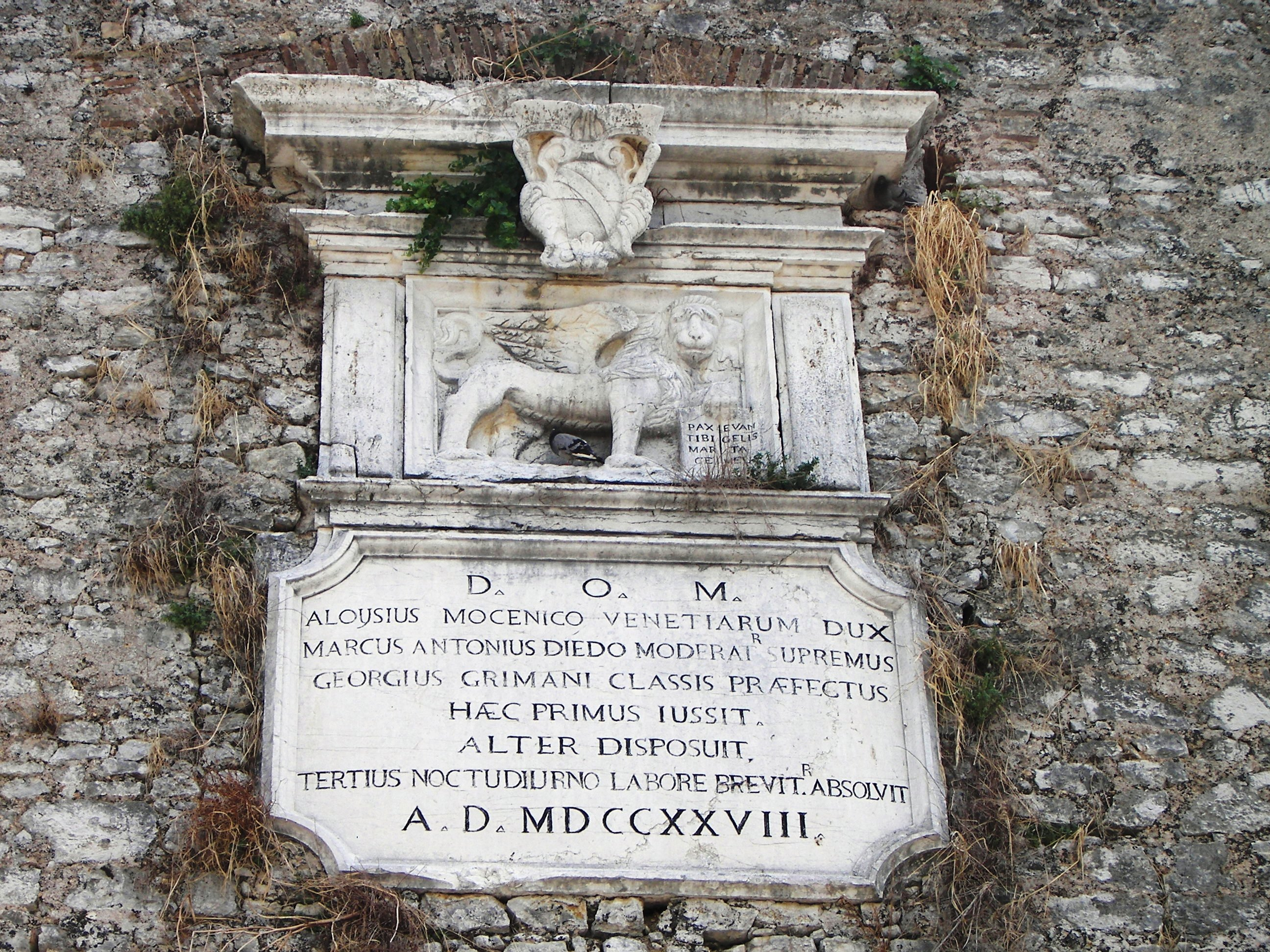
Plaque affixed to the Skarponas Rampart of the New Fortress of Corfu Town

Diedo is memorialised on a 1728 monument affixed to the outer wall of the New Fortress of Corfu Town, displaying above the Lion of Saint Mark (the symbol of Venice) and the arms of Diedo. It is inscribed in Latin as follows:

D(eo) O(ptimo) M(aximo)
Aloysius Mocenico Venetiarum Dux
Marcus Antonius Diedo Moderat(o)r Supremus
Georgius Grimani Classis Praefectus
Haec Primus Jussit
Alter Disposuit
Tertius Noctudiurno Labore Brevit(e)r Absolvit
AD MDCCXXVIII

("To God, the most good and greatest, Alvise III Mocenigo, Duke of the Venetians (i.e. Doge of Venice); Marco Antonio Diedo, Supreme Governor, Giorgio Grimani, Commander of the Fleet; the first ordered this (i.e. the wall); the second planned it; the third, by labour day and night, quickly completed it, in the year of our Lord 1728").
