= Order of the Golden Stole =

Adjunct order of the Order of Saint Mark

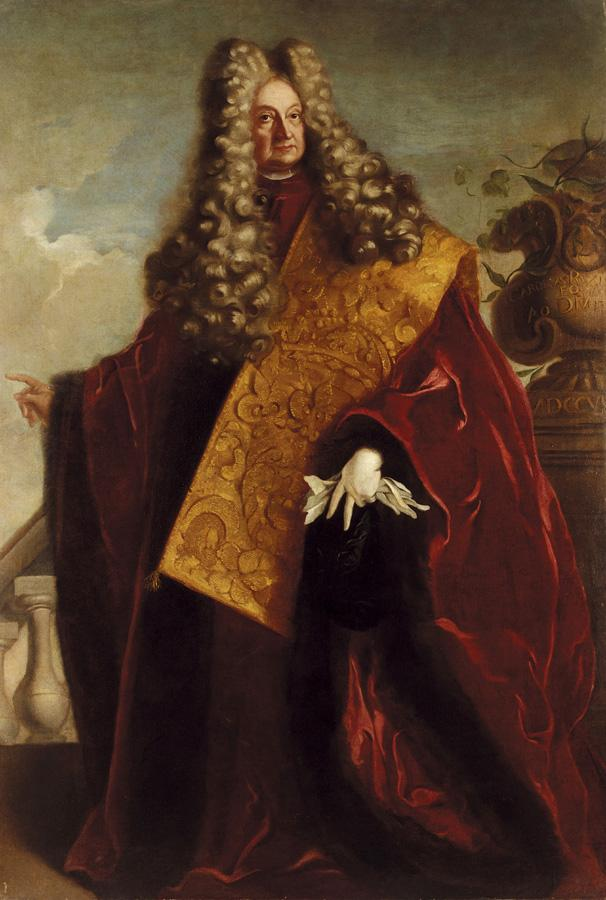
Carlo Ruzzini in the dress of a Knight of the Order of the Golden Stole

The Order of the Golden Stole or Stola d'Oro was an adjunct order of the Order of Saint Mark, in the Republic of Venice. It had a single class, that of knight (cavaliere). Its members were those members of the Order of Saint Mark who were of patrician rank, and wore a golden, flower-embroidered mantle (the eponymous stola d'oro) as a token of this.

== Sources ==
- Berry, William (1828). Encyclopædia Heraldica. Or, Complete Dictionary of Heraldry. Vol. 1. London: Sherwood, Gilbert and Piper.
