= Alvise III Mocenigo =

Doge of Venice from 1722 to 1732

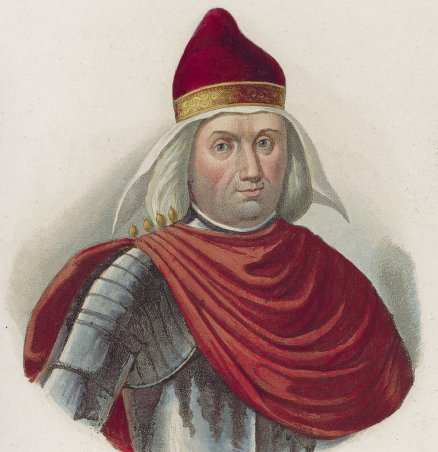

Doge of Venice
- Tenure: 24 August 1722 – 21 May 1732
- Coronation: 1722
- Predecessor: Giovanni II Cornaro
- Successor: Carlo Ruzzini
- Born: Alvise Sebastiano Mocenigo; 29 August 1662; Venice
- Died: 21 May 1732 (aged 69); Venice
Names
- Alvise III Sebastiano Mocenigo

Alvise III Sebastiano Mocenigo (1662–1732), was the 112th Doge of Venice from 1722 to 1732. He was also Provveditore Generale (Governor) of Venetian Dalmatia twice.

== Life ==
Born into one of the most important families (the House of Mocenigo) of the Venetian aristocracy, he was a famous Doge of the Republic of Venice in the 18th century, when the power of Venice started to decline. He dedicated his political life to defending Venetian possessions in the Balkans from the Ottoman Empire. When the second Ottoman siege of Corfu occurred in 1716, he was mainly responsible for strengthening Venetian fortifications that successfully resisted the attack.

In 1696 he was named Provveditore generale di Dalmazia until 1702, then again from 1717 to 1720. During his second tenure, he managed to extend Venetian Dalmatia into the hinterland, taking the areas of Signo, Imoschi and Vrgorac. These gains were confirmed in the Treaty of Passarowitz, and the new border with the Ottoman Empire was named Linea Mocenigo (Mocenigo Line) after him.

Two years later he was elected Doge: he reigned for ten years until his death in 1732.

== Mural monument in Corfu ==
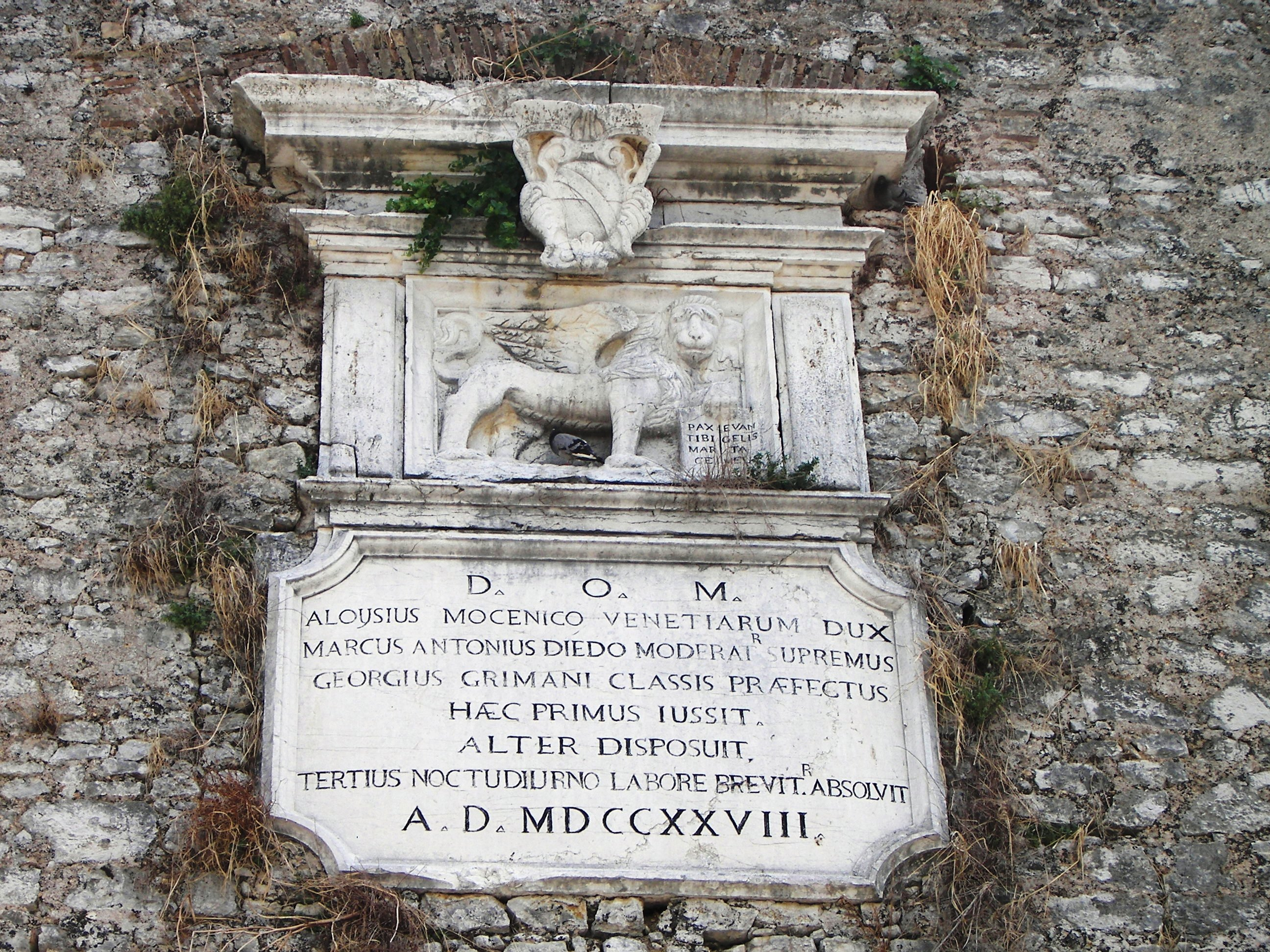
1728 Venetian monument affixed to the Defensive Wall of the New Fortress of Corfu Town in Corfu, ordered to be built by Sebastiano Alvise Mocenigo, as Doge

He is memorialised on a 1728 Venetian monument affixed to the Defensive Wall of the New Fortress of Corfu Town, displaying above the Lion of Saint Mark (the symbol of Venice) and the arms of Diedo. It is inscribed in Latin as follows:

D(eo) O(ptimo) M(aximo)
Aloysius Mocenico Venetiarum Dux
Marcus Antonius Diedo Moderat(o)r Supremus
Georgius Grimani Classis Praefectus
Haec Primus Jussit
Alter Disposuit
Tertius Noctudiurno Labore Brevit(e)r Absolvit

("To God, most good, most great, Alvise III Mocenigo, Duke of the Venetians (i.e. Doge); Marco Antonio Diedo (or Marcantonio Diedo), Supreme Governor (Venetian Provveditore Generale da Mar 1728-31 ("Superintendent General of the Sea")); Giorgio Grimani, Commander of the Fleet; the first ordered this (i.e. the Wall); the second planned it; the third, by labour day and night, quickly completed it").

== Notes ==
Political offices
Preceded by Giovanni II Cornaro	Doge of Venice; 1722–1732	Succeeded by Carlo Ruzzini
