= Order of Saint Mark =

Sole order of chivalry of the Republic of Venice

Awarded by the Doge and the Senate of the Republic of Venice
- Type: Order of chivalry
- Motto: Pax tibi, Marce Evangelista meus
- Awarded for: military and civil services
- Status: extinguished
- Doge of Venice
- Grades: Two, depending on the granting authority

The Order of Saint Mark (Italian: Ordine di San Marco) was the sole order of chivalry of the Republic of Venice. The knighthood was named in honour of Venice's patron saint, Mark the Evangelist.

== History ==
The Order of Saint Mark was the only chivalric order of the Republic of Venice. Its institution date is unknown, but quoted as early as year 787, or 1180 and fully documented since the 15th century.

The Order was awarded in two versions, according to the importance of the recipient: members of the Venetian patriciate and other high-ranking individuals received it from the Venetian Senate or the Great Council, while other, less important recipients received theirs from the Doge of Venice. The delivery of the insignia of the Order took place in the Full College or in the ducal private rooms. The Knights, however, were always armed by the Doge as head of the Republic, who touched their shoulders with a sword saying the Latin words Esto miles fidelis ('you will be a faithful knight').

The knighthood was not hereditary, with the only exceptions of the descendants of count Giacomo Zanotto, nominated Cavaliere di San Marco for the role played in the Battle of Lepanto by the doge Alvise I Mocenigo with diploma on December 16, 1571 "with benefit transmissible to all its legitimate descendants in perpetuity" and the descendants of Benedetto Quirini in 1597, awarded the Order for his great merits during the famine and plague that struck the Kingdom of Candia in 1590 and 1592. Furthermore, in 1769 Doge Alvise IV Mocenigo conferred, in perpetuity, the title of Knight of Saint Mark also to the Most Reverend Canons of the Venerable Chapter of the Cathedral of Treviso.

The Order become extinguished on May 12, 1797 with the Fall of the Republic of Venice, when the Doge and the magistrates renounced the insignia of command and the Great Council abdicated and declared the Republic of Venice lapsed.

== Insignia ==
The insignia of the order, when granted by the Doge as a "public and honorable mark for actions of marked value" and reserved for "low officers and soldiers", was a bifurcated cross enamelled in white and blue with the Lion of Saint Mark "in majesty" in the center, suspended around the neck by a gold chain, and was granted either in the gold class (which gave the right to an extra one-month pay yearly bonus) or in the silver one (with a half-month pay bonus).

When it was instead granted by the Great Council or the Senate, in addition to the cross, a gold medal was also used depicting the winged lion of Saint Mark on the recto and on the reverse a dedication inscription, hanging on a more elaborate gold necklace, often to the value of thousands of Venetian ducats.

The few patricians awarded the Order (about twenty) could not wear their insignia when they dressed in the traditional robe, and used instead a golden border on the stole of the ordinary robe, or, with the ceremonial robe, a stole of flowery gold brocade, passing from the left shoulder to the right hip, which made them known as the "Knights of the Order of the Golden Stole". However, the use of the golden stole by the patricians did not necessarily indicate the conferment of the Order of Saint Mark, as it was also used as a distinction for the knighthoods given by foreign princes and sovereigns to the ambassadors of the Most Serene Republic and recognized by the Venetian government upon their return to Venice.

== Sources ==
- Bratti, Ricciotti (1898). "I cavalieri di S. Marco". Nuovo Archivio Veneto (in Italian). 16: 321–343.
- Da Mosto, Andrea (1937). L'Archivio di Stato di Venezia. Indice Generale, Storico, Descrittivo ed Analitico. Tomo I: Archivi dell' Amministrazione Centrale della Repubblica Veneta e Archivi Notarili (in Italian). Rome: Biblioteca d'arte editrice. OCLC 772861816. Archived from the original on 2021-11-13.
