= Carlo Ruzzini =

Doge of Venice from 1732 to 1735

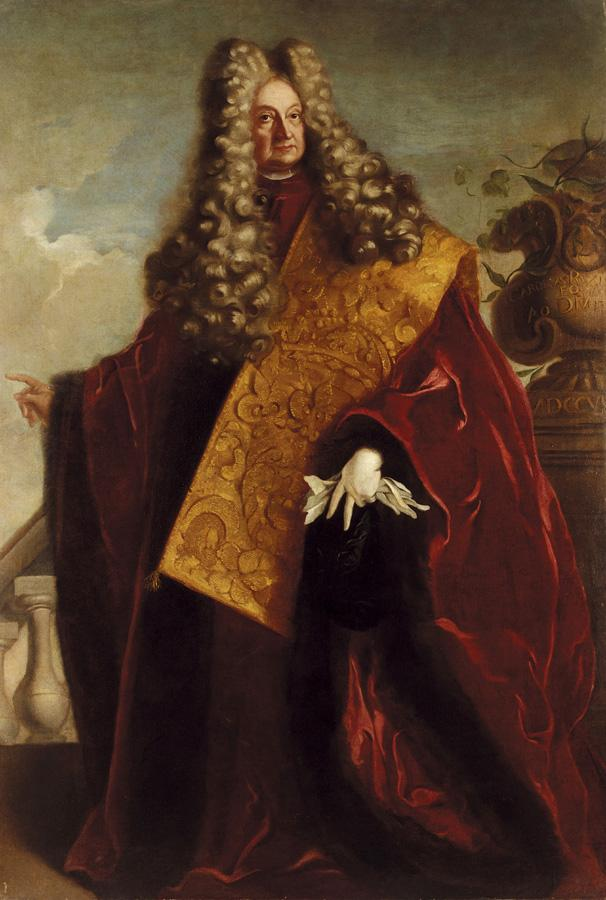
- Portrait by Gregorio Lazzarini, 1706

Doge of Venice
- Reign: 6 June 1732 – 5 January 1735
- Predecessor: Sebastiano Mocenigo
- Successor: Alvise Pisani
- Born: 11 November 1653; Venice, Republic of Venice
- Died: 5 January 1735 (aged 81); Venice, Republic of Venice
- Father: Marco Ruzzini
- Mother: Caterina Zeno
- Religion: Roman Catholicism
- Occupation: Diplomat, statesman

Carlo Ruzzini (11 November 1653 – 5 January 1735) was a Venetian diplomat, statesman, and the doge of Venice from 1732 to 1735.

== Biography ==
Ruzzini was born in Venice, the eldest child of wealthy parents, Marco Ruzzini and Caterina Zeno.

By the end of the 17th century the Republic of Venice was losing ground in its constant diplomatic and military struggle with the Turkish Empire, so there was great need for diplomats such as Carlo Ruzzini who had both the education and the requisite personal fortune to qualify for the diplomatic service.

Starting his career of public service at 26 running the Venetian Arsenal and dockyard, Carlo Ruzzini became a diplomat and was sent as ambassador to Madrid in 1691. As the ambassador to Vienna, in July 1698 he was organizing the visit of the Russian Tsar Peter the Great to Venice, but that tour was failed because of the Streltsy revolt in Moscow. Later Ruzzini represented Venice during the negotiations at Carlowitz (1698-1699), managing to obtain some advantages for his country. His indecision and fear of making the wrong decision—partly due to his brief and the need to constantly consult the Venetian Council—caused much irritation with the other participants who, therefore, contrived to exclude Venice and him from the more important decisions. This episode however did not stunt his career, as is demonstrated later by his appointment first as Venetian ambassador in The Hague (1706), to the Turkish Court (1707) and in Vienna. He was Venice's ambassador extraordinary at other important international negotiations such as at Utrecht in 1712. However, Venice's decline and the fact that its power was now largely restricted to within Italian borders meant that his part was a minor one.

At the conclusion of the last of the wars between Venice and Turkey (1714–1718), Ruzzini represented the republic during the peace negotiations at Passarowitz in July 1718. The inherent weakness in Venice's strategic position meant that little was gained and much lost in the negotiations.

After the Treaty of Passarowitz, Ruzzini continued his diplomatic career with a second posting to Constantinople, before ill health forced him home. However, his wide experience meant he continued to play an important part in the political life of the republic.

He was a candidate for Doge in 1722 but was beaten by Alvise III Sebastiano Mocenigo. Ten years later, on 6 June 1732, on Mocenigo's death, Ruzzini was easily elected with 40 votes out of 41.

During his brief reign he achieved little of note but kept Venice neutral and out of further conflicts.

== Sources ==
- Rendina, Claudio (1994). I dogi. Storia e segreti. Rome: Newton Compton.

Political offices
Preceded by Sebastiano Mocenigo	Doge of Venice; 1732–1735	Succeeded by Alvise Pisani
