= Capitano delle Navi =

The Capitano delle Navi (lit. 'Captain of the Ships') was a senior commander of the ships of the line of the navy of the Republic of Venice.

== History and functions ==
The Venetian navy had traditionally been a galley-based force. The first organized tactical formations of sailing ships began being formed in the late 15th century. The position of Capitano delle Navi was established as the commander of the larger sailing ships built by the Venetian government, but he also assumed control—under the overall authority of the Captain General of the Sea—over all sailing ships in the battle fleet, which were mostly merchant vessels, chartered in Venice or abroad (usually from the Dutch Republic) for naval service.

During the 17th century sailing ships of the line began to play a more important role and comprised a larger and larger portion of the Venetian battle fleet, particularly during the War of Candia. The increase in numbers necessitated the creation of more squadrons of sail, initially by the appointment of a second Capitano delle Navi or of a Vice Capitano delle Navi, but on 25 May 1657 two new positions, the Almirante and the Patron delle Navi were created to command the second and third sailing ship divisions, while the Capitano delle Navi commanded the first division.

At the outbreak of the Morean War in 1684 the Republic mobilized 24 sailing ships along with 30 galleys, and during that conflict and the subsequent Seventh Ottoman–Venetian War, the sailing ships played the main role in fleet actions. During the latter two wars, when the Venetians sent as many as 36 ships of the line into battle, the senior position of Capitano Straordinario delle Navi was created, who now commanded the first division of 9 ships, while the Capitano delle Navi commanded the second and so on.

The post of Capitano delle Navi remained the highest peacetime rank for the commanders of the Venetian sailing fleet (armata grossa). Appointment to the post was usually for three years. As distinctive signs, the flagship (the capitana) of the Capitano delle Navi carried a single lantern aft, the standard of Saint Mark on the starboard side aft, and on the mainmast a square ensign of Saint Mark.

== Sources ==
- Lane, Frederic C. (1973). "Naval actions and fleet organization, 1499–1502". In Hale, John R. (ed.). Renaissance Venice. London: Faber & Faber. pp. 146–173.
- Nani Mocenigo, Mario (1935). Storia della marina veneziana: da Lepanto alla caduta della Repubblica [History of the Venetian navy: from Lepanto to the fall of the Republic] (in Italian). Rome: Tipo lit. Ministero della Marina - Uff. Gabinetto.
