= Patron delle Navi =

The Patron delle Navi, also Patrono or Patrona delle Navi, was a squadron commander of the ships of the line of the navy of the Republic of Venice.

== History ==
Although it began using sailing ships in its battle line during the 15th century, the Venetian navy had traditionally been a galley-based force. During the 17th century sailing ships of the line began to play a more important role and comprised a larger and larger portion of the Venetian battle fleet, particularly during the War of Candia.

The increase in numbers necessitated the creation of more squadrons of sail, and thus on 25 May 1657 two new positions, the Almirante and the Patron delle Navi were created to command the second and third sailing ship divisions, while a Capitano delle Navi commanded the first division. The term patron or patrona meant 'skipper', especially of galleys, but was also frequently applied to ships, especially the ship next in rank to the flagship (the capitana). Thus the title of Patron delle Navi has the meaning of 'vice-admiral of the ships'.

Appointment to the post was usually for three years. As distinctive signs, the flagship of the Patron delle Navi carried a single lantern aft, the standard of Saint Mark on the starboard side aft, and on the foremast or the mizzen mast a square ensign of Saint Mark.

== Sources ==
- Kahane, Henry; Kahane, Renée; Tietze, Andreas (1958). The Lingua Franca in the Levant: Turkish Nautical Terms of Italian and Greek Origin. Urbana: University of Illinois Press. LCCN 58-6996.
- Lane, Frederic C. (1973). "Naval actions and fleet organization, 1499–1502". In Hale, John R. (ed.). Renaissance Venice. London: Faber & Faber. pp. 146–173.
- Nani Mocenigo, Mario (1935). Storia della marina veneziana: da Lepanto alla caduta della Repubblica [History of the Venetian navy: from Lepanto to the fall of the Republic] (in Italian). Rome: Tipo lit. Ministero della Marina - Uff. Gabinetto.
