= Capitano Straordinario delle Navi =

Senior Venetian naval commander

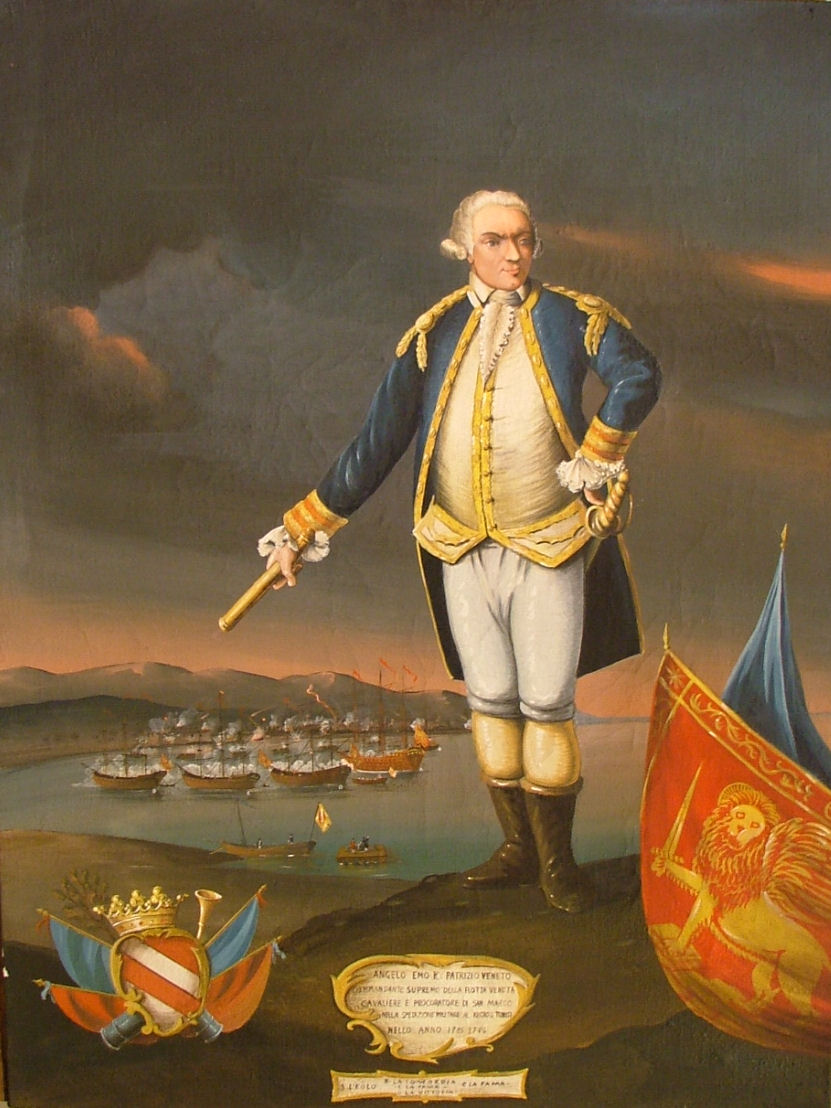
Angelo Emo, the last Capitano Straordinario delle Navi

The Capitano Straordinario delle Navi (lit. 'Captain Extraordinary of the Sailing Ships') was the senior wartime commander of the ships of the line of the navy of the Republic of Venice.

== History and functions ==
The Venetian navy had traditionally been a galley-based force. The first organized tactical formations of sailing ships—originally merchant vessels chartered for naval service—began being formed in the late 15th century. The position of Capitano delle Navi was established as the commander of the sailing squadron in the battle fleet, under the overall authority of the Captain General of the Sea. During the 17th century sailing ships of the line began to play a more important role and comprised a larger and larger portion of the Venetian battle fleet, particularly during the War of Candia, leading to the creation of divisions of the sailing battle fleet (the armata grossa), and the posts of Almirante and Patron delle Navi established in 1657 to command these.

In the Morean War (1684–1699) and the Seventh Ottoman–Venetian War (1714–1718) the armata grossa already played the main role in combat, and with as many as 36 ships, the senior position of Capitano Straordinario delle Navi was created. He served as commander-in-chief of the sailing fleet and commanded the first division of 9 ships, while the Capitano delle Navi commanded the second, etc.

The post of Capitano Straordinario delle Navi was a wartime appointment only. As distinctive signs, his flagship carried a single lantern aft, the standard of Saint Mark on the starboard side aft, and on the mainmast a square ensign of Saint Mark. In peacetime, these were the insignia of the flagship of the Capitano delle Navi. Following the Peace of Passarowitz in 1718, the Venetian navy was reduced in size and limited to its peacetime duties; the only time a Capitano Straordinario delle Navi was appointed again was in 1784, when Angelo Emo was sent to lead a naval expedition against the Beylik of Tunis.

== Sources ==
- Nani Mocenigo, Mario (1935). Storia della marina veneziana: da Lepanto alla caduta della Repubblica [History of the Venetian navy: from Lepanto to the fall of the Republic] (in Italian). Rome: Tipo lit. Ministero della Marina - Uff. Gabinetto.
