= Visković =

Visković is a surname. Notable people with the surname include:

- Ivo Visković (born 1949), Serbian diplomat of Croatian origin
- Josip Visković, Venetian count from the Bay of Kotor
- Velimir Visković (born 1951), Croatian writer

== See also ==
- Vasković
- Višković
- Fisković
