= Viškovci (disambiguation) =

Viškovci can refer to:

- Viškovci, a village and municipality in Osijek-Baranja County, Croatia
- Viškovci, Požega-Slavonia County, a village near Pleternica, Croatia

== See also ==
- Višković, Serbian family name
