= Vasković =

Vasković (Serbian Cyrillic: Васковић) is a Serbian surname. Notable people with the surname include:

- Boris Vasković (born 1975), Serbian footballer
- Zoran Vasković (born 1979), Serbian footballer

== See also ==
- Vasović
- Visković
