= Venetian Province =

Province of the Austrian Empire (1798–1805)

Venetian Province Provinsa Veneta (Venetian) Provinz Venedig (German)
- Province of the Habsburg monarchy
- 1798–1805
- Coat of arms

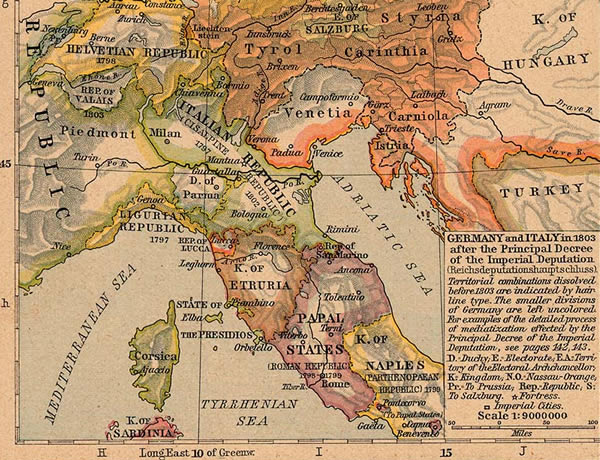
- Austrian Venetia in 1803, William R. Shepherd (1926)
- Capital: Venice
- History
  - Treaty of Campo Formio: 1798
  - Treaty of Lunéville: 1801
  - Treaty of Pressburg: 1805
| Preceded by | Succeeded by |
| Provisional Municipality of Venice | Kingdom of Italy |

The Venetian Province (Venetian: Provinsa Veneta; German: Provinz Venedig) was the name of the territory of the former Republic of Venice ceded by the French First Republic to the Habsburg monarchy under the terms of the 1797 Treaty of Campo Formio that ended the War of the First Coalition. The province's capital was Venice.

In the course of the French Italian campaign of 1796–1797, the Signoria of Venice under Doge Ludovico Manin had rejected an alliance with the French, whereupon General Napoleon Bonaparte occupied the city on 14 May 1797, leading to the fall of the Republic of Venice and the establishment of the Provisional Municipality of Venice. In exchange for renouncing all rights to the Austrian Netherlands and recognizing the French Cisalpine Republic, Francis II, Holy Roman Emperor gained the conquered Venetian territory including the Dalmatian coast but not the smaller Ionian Islands, beyond.

As with the other Habsburg realms of the time, this new province of Venice was held as a de jure separate entity in a personal union, with Francis taking the additional title of "Duke of Venice". Like many of his other realms it was not subject to the Holy Roman Empire. The province was directed by an Austrian governor, but continued to use former Venetian legislation and maintained its currency, the Venetian lira. The western border of the province was shifted in favour of the Cisalpine Republic by the 1801 Treaty of Lunéville, and drawn up along the thalweg of the lower Adige river.

Unlike the previous 1,100-year-old republic, the province did not have a long existence. After the Grande Armée had defeated the forces of the Austrian Empire at Austerlitz, Francis, as per the 1805 Treaty of Pressburg, had to cede the Venetian territory to the Napoleonic Kingdom of Italy. In 1815, it was returned to Austria under the terms of the Final Act of the Congress of Vienna and became part of the crown land of Lombardy–Venetia.
