= Provisional Municipality of Venice =

Italian sister republic of Revolutionary France from 1797 to 1798

Provisional Municipality of Venice Municipalità Provvisoria di Venezia (Italian)
- 1797–1798
- By decree of 18 May 1797, the Provisional Municipality adopted the "tricolor cockade green, white, and red"
- Status: Client state of France
- Capital: Venice
- Common languages: Venetian
- Government: Republic
- Historical era: French Revolutionary Wars
  - Established: 16 May 1797
  - Austrian annexation: 18 January 1798
Preceded by
Republic of Venice
Succeeded by
Venetian Province
Cisalpine Republic
French departments of Greece
- Today part of: Italy; Greece

The Provisional Municipality of Venice (Italian: Municipalità Provvisoria di Venezia) was a provisional republican regime set up by the French First Republic after the Fall of the Republic of Venice and the occupation of Venice itself by French troops on 16 May 1797. Its territory encompassed the parts of Veneto that had belonged to the Venetian Terraferma. The Provisional Municipality lasted for the duration of the French occupation, until the arrival of Austrian troops on 18 January 1798, in accordance with the Treaty of Campo Formio, and the annexation of the Veneto as the Venetian Province of the Habsburg empire.

== Sources ==
- Panciera, Walter (2021). The Republic of Venice in the 18th Century. Translated by Kalina Yamboliev. Viella Libreria Editrice. ISBN 978-88-3313-757-5.
- Romano, Dennis (2024). Venice: The Remarkable History of the Lagoon City. Oxford University Press. ISBN 978-0-19085998-5.
- Scarabello, Giovanni (1998). "La municipalità democratica". Storia di Venezia dalle origini alla caduta della Serenissima. Vol. VIII, L'ultima fase della Serenissima (in Italian). Rome: Istituto della Enciclopedia Italiana. pp. 263–355.
