= Višković =

Višković (Serbian: Вишковић) is a South Slavic surname. Notable people with the surname include:

- Dalibor Višković (born 1977), Croatian footballer
- Despot Višković (born 1980), Serbian footballer
- Radovan Višković (born 1964), Bosnian politician

== See also ==
- Viškovci (disambiguation), names of several municipalities
