= Giuseppe Viscovich =

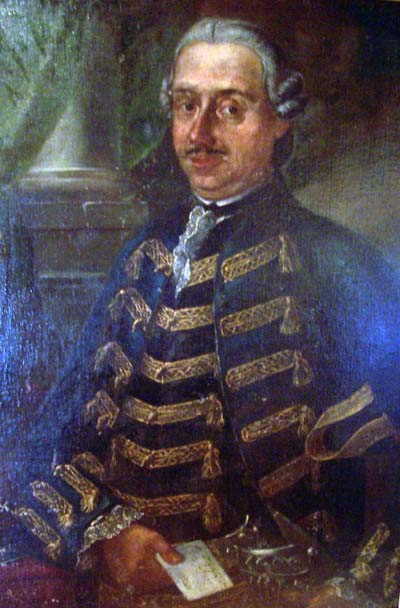
- Occupation: military

Giuseppe Viscovich, also Josip Visković, was a Venetian count. He was the Captain of the town of Perast (now in Montenegro), the last territory of the Republic of Venice to surrender to France.

On August 23, 1797, the citizens of Perast gathered to bury the flag of the Republic under the altar of the cathedral, to prevent it from falling into enemy hands. Before the kneeling crowd, Viscovich delivered an emotional speech, the Discorso de Perasto, still well known to Venetians. Contemporary chroniclers say that Giuseppe said to his young grandson, present at the ceremony, "You too kneel, Annibale, and remember these words as long as you live."

Captain Viscovich's impassioned speech is often cited as an expression of the loyalty which many Croatian, Serbian and Montenegrin subjects of the Venetian Republic felt.
