= Giovanni Soranzo =

Doge of Venice from 1312 to 1328

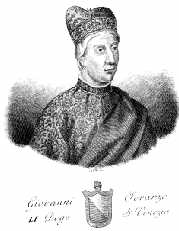

Doge of Venice
- In office 1312–1328
- Preceded by: Marino Zorzi
- Succeeded by: Francesco Dandolo

Personal details
- Born: 1240
- Died: December 21, 1328 (aged 87–88)
- Resting place: St Mark's Basilica

Giovanni Soranzo (Latin: Iohannes Superantio; 1240 – 31 December 1328) was a Venetian statesman of the prominent Soranzo family who served as the 51st Doge of Venice. He ascended to the position on 13 July 1312 and served until his death. Soranzo was a member of a noble family; he was married to Franchesina. In 1310 his son-in-law, Niccolo' Querini was exiled for life from Venice for taking part in the Tiepolo conspiracy to overthrow the state. Soranzo was succeeded as Doge by Francesco Dandolo. He was also an Italian politician, diplomat and admiral.

== Origin & Family ==
Son of Antonio Soranzo, who was procurator of San Marco, he was born around 1245, probably in the parish of Sant'Angelo where his family's residence was located. The year of his birth can be deduced from the chronicle of Gian Giacomo Caroldo, according to which at the time of his appointment as doge he was 67 years old. There is no basis for what is reported by genealogists of the modern era, according to which he was born in Burano in 1240.

From his will, drawn up on 8 August 1321, we know that he had married Francesca Molin. From her (or from a previous wife of whom we have no information) he had three sons and three daughters: Marino (married to a certain Caterina), Nicolò (before he died), Antonio known as "Belello", Soranzo (married to Nicolò Querini), Elena (Benedictine in San Giovanni di Torcello) and Fontana (Franciscan in Santa Maria Maggiore).

== Political & Military career ==
He had been elected several times to the Great Council (1264, 1266–68, 1270, 1275, 1281, 1295), he was also mayor of Poreč and during this mandate, he suffered excommunication by the local bishop Boniface, who had pro- Aquileian tendencies. He then sat in the Minor Council and in 1290, after the election of Doge Pietro Gradenigo, he became ducal councillor. He was also mayor in Chioggia ( 1294 ), in Isola d'Istria (end of the century), and in Pula ( 1299 ). In 1300 he participated in a diplomatic mission with Andrea Sanudo to Frederick III of Sicily. He was then count of Zadar in 1301 - 03, ambassador to Egypt and again count of Zadar in 1305 - 07.

In the last years of the century he became the protagonist of a heroic military enterprise. In the spring of 1296, during the disastrous war against Genoa, he left Venice at the head of a fleet headed for Constantinople and captured an enemy galley stationed on the Bosphorus . Having freed access to the Black Sea, the squadron joined other Venetian boats and attacked the Ligurian colony of Caffa in Crimea, plundering and destroying several enemy ships. With the arrival of autumn Soranzo withdrew the fleet to Negroponte, entrusting it to Andrea Dandolo, and returned to Venice where he was welcomed with all honors.

He had different luck a decade later, when he was among the main protagonists of the Ferrara war . Before the start of the conflict, in 1307, he was sent to Azzo VIII d'Este to offer the help of the Doge Gradenigo against the Papal States . With the death of the marquis, the following year, the Venetians occupied the city and the doge designated Soranzo podestà from November 1308 to March 1309 . Pope Clement V 's reaction was not long in coming and, after having hurled the interdict and excommunication on Venice on 27 March 1309, he quickly took control of Ferrara. At this point Soranzo was put at the head of a fleet with the aim of reconquering the lower course of the Po, but the undertaking ended in serious failure .

Despite this, in the same year he obtained the prestigious appointment as Procurator of Saint Mark and became one of the eligible candidates for Gradenigo's succession to the dogate. Meanwhile, the fate of the war had created discontent within the nobility, which resulted, in June 1310, in the well-known conspiracy hatched by Baiamonte Tiepolo and Marco Querini (related to Soranzo, since his daughter Soranza had married Nicolò Querini). After the failure of the coup and the death of Querini, it was Soranzo who led the negotiations with Tiepolo so that he would surrender .

The course of these events did not resolve the problems of domestic and foreign politics. During the last year of Gradenigo's government, Zara rebelled once again, while under his successor Marino Zorzi, doge for less than a year, the issues remained unresolved .

When Zorzi died on 3 July 1312, Soranzo represented the most suitable candidate to succeed him, as he was welcome both by the Ghibelline faction loyal to Gradenigo and by the hostile one, and the most suitable for relaxing relations with the Pope. On 13 July he therefore ascended to the ducal throne .

== Dogate ==
As first measures, he dealt with resolving the still open war issues. He sent Francesco Dandolo to Avignon to conduct exhausting negotiations, which led on 26 January 1313 to the lifting of the interdict and excommunication and on 17 February to definitive peace (through the bull Decet sedis ), however unfavorable to Venice.

He then closed the problem of Zara by subjecting the city to a heavy siege which forced it to surrender, sanctioned in September 1313 with a treaty of submission.

In these years trials began for the survivors of the conspiracy, to which the Doge had to comply without being able to exercise any clemency. Among the condemned there was also her daughter Soranza, banished with her husband Nicolò Querini; she later tried to return to the city trusting in the intervention of her father, but she was confined to the monastery of Santa Maria delle Vergini by decision of the newly formed Council of Ten.

For the rest, the Soranzo government represented a period of peace, in which attempts were made to resolve international issues with diplomacy rather than war. It was from this perspective that the project for a new crusade, propagated by Marino Sanuto the Elder in the Liber secretorum fidelium Crucis, was rejected . While, as regards the Venetian mainland, Venice kept out of the war events involving Cangrande I della Scala, with whom they tried to maintain good relations thanks to a treaty concluded in 1317.

There was also a resumption of trade by sea (although hindered by some acts of piracy by the Turks and Genoese), with the signing of agreements with the empires of Byzantium and Trebizond and the kingdoms of Armenia, Cyprus, Sicily and Tunis; in addition, the route which, through the Strait of Gibraltar, reached Flanders and England was strengthened . Land trade was also favored by agreements with various cities of the Po Valley, including Bologna, Brescia, Como and Milan.

During the 1320s the subjugation of Dalmatia was completed through the dedication of cities such as Šibenik, Split and Nin.

The last days of the dogate were marked by the repression of a new conspiracy, hatched by members of the Barozzi family.

== Death ==
After his death he was buried in the Basilica of San Marco, in a tomb that has been preserved to this day. However, in the first half of the twentieth century, a fourteenth-century image of him reported on a sheet of the State Archives of Venice was stolen .

Soranzo was a man of culture and had contacts with some intellectuals, including Tanto, great chancellor and author of poems in Latin, and the pre-humanist Albertino Mussato, with whom he maintained a correspondence concerning the birth of three cubs from a pair of lions that Federico III of Aragon had donated it to the Doge (an event so unusual that it was recorded in the oldest of the Libri pactorum of the Municipality). He also had the opportunity to meet Dante Alighieri in 1321, when the poet took part in a diplomatic mission on behalf of Guido Novello da Polenta, lord of Ravenna .
