= Pietro Querini Pezzagallo =

Pietro Querini, commonly called Pezzagallo, was a member of the patrician House of Querini. He served as Bailo of Negroponte, one of the most senior appointments in the Republic of Venice's overseas empire, in 1306–1308. On his return he was tried and fined with 500 ducats because he had allowed his son Nicolo to maltreat a member of the local Jewish community. In 1309 he was again convicted and fined because he had resisted a search for concealed weapons by the Signori di Notte and assaulted the responsible officer. Along with his brother Marco Querini he was involved in the Tiepolo conspiracy of 1310.

== Sources ==
- Hazlitt, W. Carew (1860). The Venetian Republic: Its Rise, its Growth, and its Fall, 421–1797. Volume II. London: Smith, Elder & Co. ISBN 978-0-404-03194-7.
- Hopf, Carlo (1856). Dissertazione documentata sulla storia di Karystos nell'isola di Negroponte, 1205 - 1470 (in Italian). Translated by G. B. de Sardagna. Venice: Pietro Naratovich.
