= Marco Querini =

Italian politician and diplomat (1245–1310)

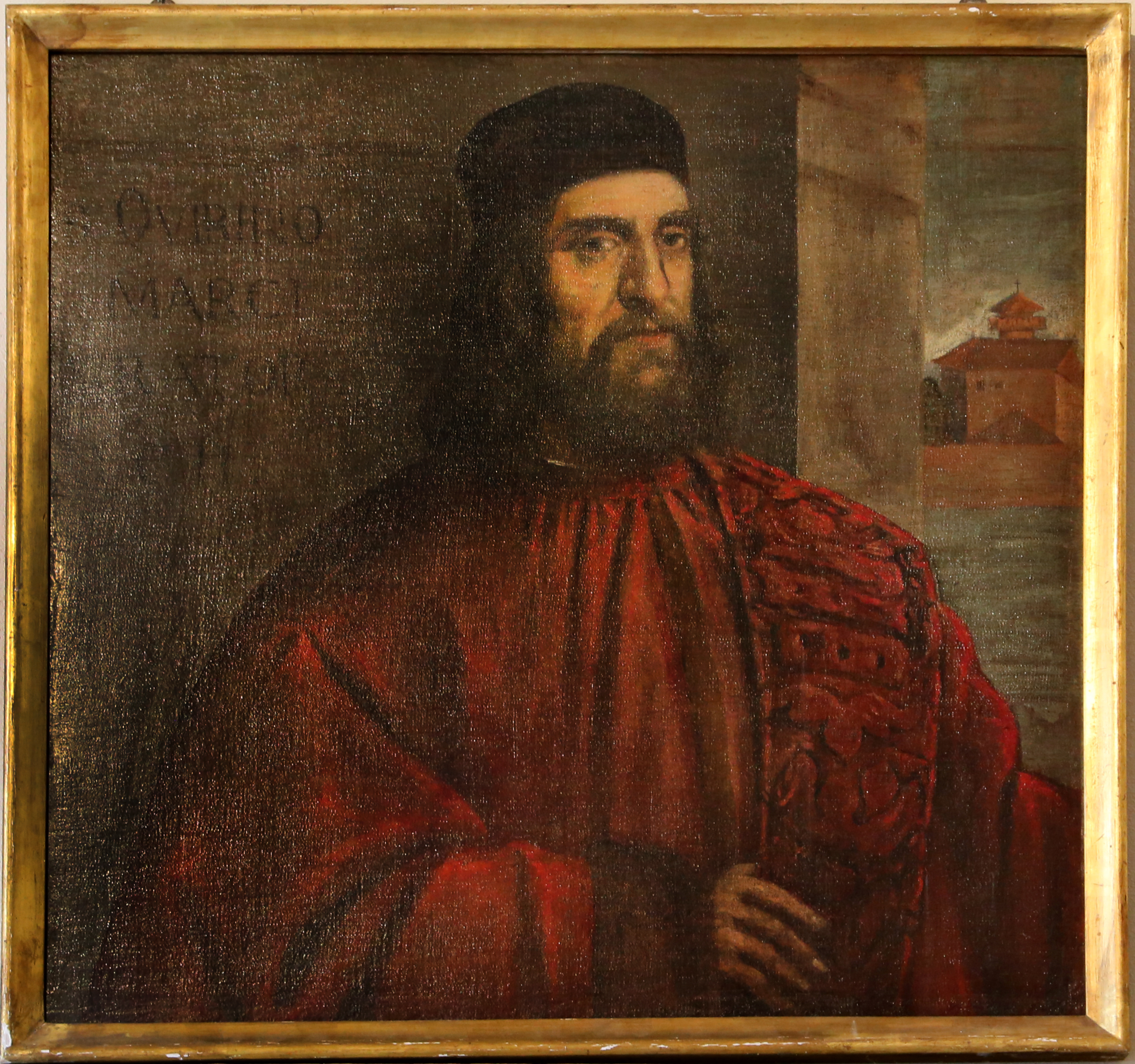
- Portrait of Marco Querini by Marco Vecellio

Personal details
- Born: c. 1245 Parish of San Matteo de Rialto
- Died: 15 June 1310 (aged 65) Venice

Marco Querini (ca. 1245 – 15 June 1310) was an Italian politician and diplomat. He was one of the leaders of the Tiepolo conspiracy, an attempt to overthrow the Doge of Venice Pietro Gradenigo.

== Querini family ==
The Querini family had numerous holdings in the Ferrara and Polesine regions, which were under the control of the House of Este. The Querini family were Guelphs, or pro-pope. In fact, Ferrara was under the rule of one Giovanni Querini, and in 1255, would acquire an estate in Papozze for the family. These connections to mainland Italy and focus on landed properties separated them from the majority of the Venetian houses, which focused on trade.

== Biography ==
=== Early life ===
He was born around 1245 in the parish of San Matteo di Rialto to Nicolò di Giovanni (his mother's name is unknown). His family's connections to mainland Italy influences his marriages, as was seen in his marriage with Maria di Marco Badoer—she was the sister of Marino Badoer, who married Balzanella da Peraga and Mabilia da Lendinara, the heirs of the noble Paduan family. In order to combat this power, the Great Council of Venice passed a law in 1274 that excluded them from their deliberations, all of whom sought to protect their property. Nevertheless, Marco and Maria had four sons and two daughter, one of whom married Baiamonte Tiepolo.

Not much else is known about Marco Querini before 1310, except for one instance that could've concerned a son of Giacomo with the same name, who was the procurator of San Marco in 1302. On 27 November 1285, he replaced Marino Morosini as the ducal advisor, although we don't know exactly for what reason, seeing as the previous ducal advisor's contract hadn't expired. In 1295, he most like held the important podestà office of Capodistria. It is possible that the Querini family held interest in the Istria region, since from 1293 to 1294, he held the podestà office in Parenzo. He was also devoted to his mainland assets, purchasing some properties—specifically, in Musestre—from his brother-in-law Andrea Badoer in 1296.

After a period of silence, he once again appears in 23 March 1301 when, as a senator, he participated in a resolution against the Republic of Genoa. In 1302, during the Salt War, he was sent to Padua. He was particularly interested in the salt, as on 10 September 1303, he received a formal notice warning him about transporting salt to Pavia and Milan. He returned to Venice on 16 December 1303.

His role during the War of Ferrara, a conflict in which the "Ghibelline" (pro-emperor) doge Pietro Gradenigo occupied the Este city of Ferrara against the wishes of the Pope, was much more significant than anything else up until this point, as the Querini family had personal interests in the area. Marco Querini would be directly involved in the war after he and the Count of Veglia, Doimo, were called to replace Andrea Querini (he was part of the House of Querini's Santa Maria Formosa branch), who fell ill, as the head of the reinforcements for the troops inside Tedaldo Castle. However, due to numerous disagreements with Doimo, Marco abandoned the castle on the night between 27 and 28 August 1309 and took refuge in the Mantua area, where he was captured by Alboino della Scala and taken prisoner. The Venetian government belatedly demanded the release of Marco, doing so only on 7 January 1310—this was due to divisions in the Venetian ruling class: there were those who were opposed to the war, and there were those were in favor of the war. This division would serve as the basis for the Tiepolo conspiracy.

=== Tiepolo conspiracy ===
His previous troubles with the Venetian government led him to stage a coup on the dawn of 15 June 1310. This revolt was led by him, his brother-in-law Baiamonte Tiepolo, and Badoero Badoer. However, there were two major issues: a storm prevented Badoero from sailing his men to Venice, and this coup lacked the element of surprise—information about this coup had leaked, and the Doge had time to organize a defense, which he entrusted to Marco Giustinian, Antolin Dandolo, and other of his supporters. As a result, Marco Querini and his son Benedetto were killed by the Doge's supporters; another one of his sons, Nicolò, managed to escape to the Treviso area and then to Dalmatia, where he continued to plot with Tiepolo. In response to the coup, the Council of Ten was established on 10 July 1310. One of its first acts was, on 5 November 1310, to destroy the Ca' Granda dei Querini.
