= Agostino Amadi =

Venetian cryptologist

Agostino Amadi (Venice, ..., 1588), also written as Agostin, or Augostino Amadi, was a Venetian writer who created a manuscript on ciphers. It is assumed that he was a teacher of ciphers, but it is not known if he ever worked at the Council of Ten in that capacity.

== The manuscript ==
The Amadi manuscript contained 700 pages and was bought by the Council of Ten from his widow on 16 March 1588. It was titled: "Agostino Amadi. Trattato delle cifre. 1588. Trattato delle cifre. Venezia". Ciphers of Agostino Amadi, 1588 in the Archivio di Stato di Venezia. The archive kept the contents secure and secret for hundreds of years. The manuscript was then sold to the Emperor of Austria and moved to Vienna in 1799 and stored under Cod. 313. It was only in 1869 that it was returned to the Venetian Archives in Italy.

Agostino must have owned a huge collection of mathematical and musical books, about 1,500 of them, as well as many instruments.

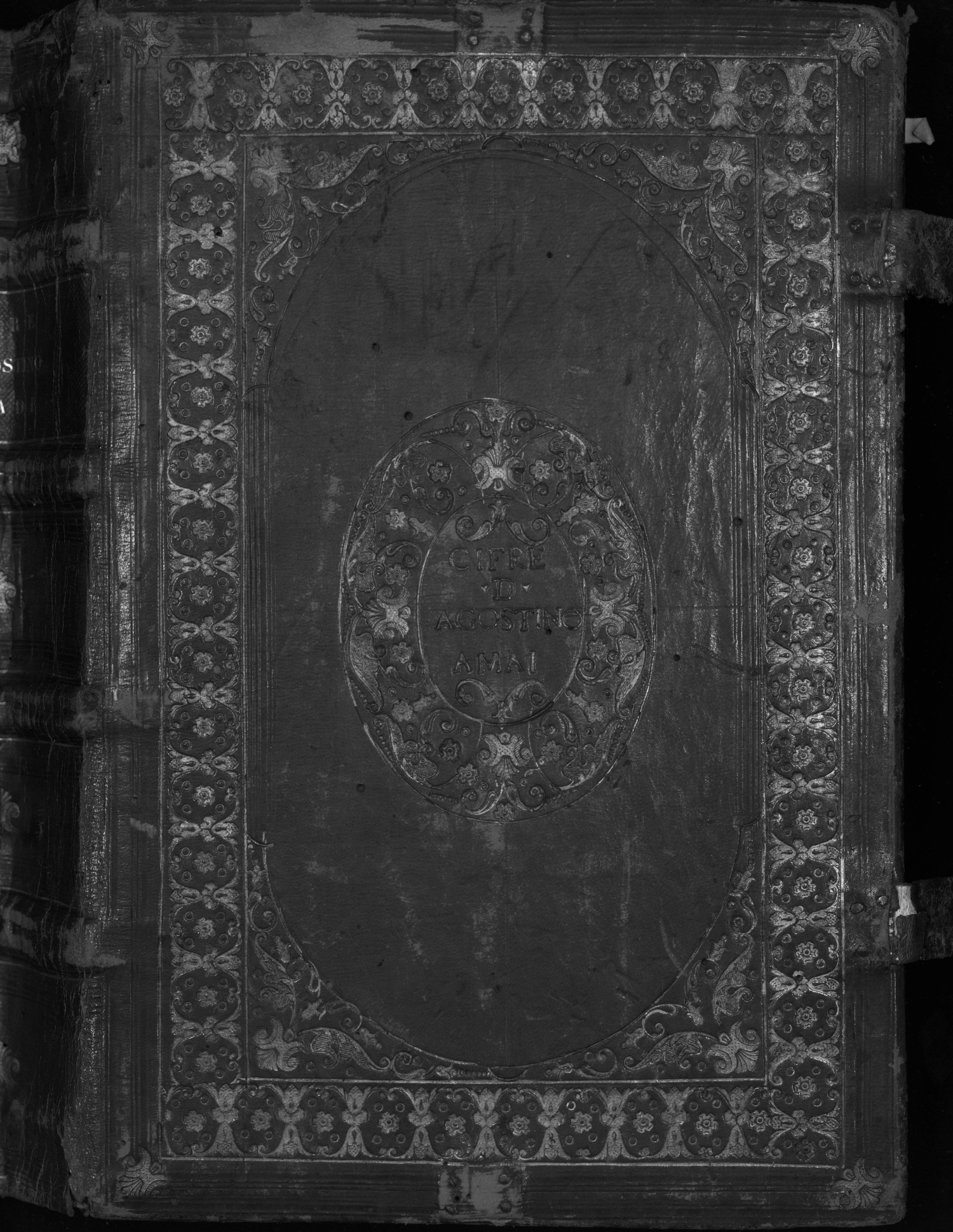
Bound Amadi manuscript leather cover containing all volumes.

== The contents ==
The first volume teaches the different ways of coding "in simple, double and multiple alphabets", with extensive use of "rotae", rotating alphabets made of parchment and a coloured thread. The second volume is dedicated to the art of trazer: decoding the cipher without having the decryption key.

The great cipher collector Luigi Pasini (1835-1885), the archivist in the State Archives of Venice, wrote:

"The volumes by our loyal citizen Agostin Amadi, who recently died, provide instructions for writing simple and double ciphers and for using several alphabets. They teach the art of deciphering unknown ciphers without code sheet, both in our language and in foreign ones, with beautiful, clear and realistic rules, so that anyone who puts in some exercise and diligence can make true progress in a short time. They also teach different ways of writing secret messages, strengthening a cipher so that it cannot be understood; they teach ways of writing invisible, undetectable ciphers, of reviving dead letters, and other important secrets. All this is contained in said volumes, as stated in the communication from the cautious and loyal Milledonne, secretary of this council, and Vianello, secretary of the Senate. These volumes are so important and so unique that it is not good for the service of our state to leave them in the hands of private citizens, risking that they fall in other hands, possibly foreign hands. Therefore, the children of our well-deserving citizen who remained in extreme poverty will be rewarded with the usual generosity of Our Lordship", etc.".
