= War of Ferrara (1308–1313) =

14th century military conflict between the Papacy and Venice

The War of Ferrara was fought in 1308–1313 between the Republic of Venice and the House of Este, backed by the Papacy. It began as a succession struggle in Ferrara following the death of Marquis Azzo VIII d'Este. Venice supported the claims of Azzo's illegitimate son, Fresco, against Azzo's brother, Francesco, who in turn sought support from Pope Clement V.

Venice seized Castel Tedaldo in Ferrara, while parts of the city came under Papal control. After Venice rebuffed a Papal embassy, the Republic was placed under interdict and a crusade declared against it; Venice responded by annexing Ferrara outright.

By 1309, the Venetians found themselves confronted by a large coalition of local cities, including Bologna, Ravenna and Padua, that resented Venetian economic dominance and now feared a looming political hegemony as well. Venice had the support of Treviso and the Scaligers of Verona, but suffered critical setbacks, including failed revolts in Aquileia, Istria, and Zara. The loss of the Marcamò fort blocked use of the Ferrarese branch of the Po River, and eventually the Venetian garrison in Ferrara, weakened by military defeats and disease, was overwhelmed in August 1309, after a relief fleet led by Marco Querini was defeated.

Long negotiations followed, before a treaty was concluded in 1313 that ended the war in a complete Papal victory: Venice surrendered all claims to Ferrara, recognized it as Papal territory, and agreed to restrictions on its use of the Po River. Though the terms were harsh, Venice retained access to the Po over Ferrara, ensuring control over critical trade routes. The tensions created by the war also played a role in the conception of the failed conspiracy of Marco Querini and Bajamonte Tiepolo in 1310.

== Sources ==
- Hazlitt, W. Carew (1860). The Venetian Republic: Its Rise, its Growth, and its Fall, 421–1797. Volume II. London: Smith, Elder & Co. ISBN 978-0-404-03194-7.
- Hazlitt, W. Carew (1860). The Venetian Republic: Its Rise, its Growth, and its Fall, 421–1797. Volume III. London: Smith, Elder & Co.
- Romano, Dennis (2024). Venice: The Remarkable History of the Lagoon City. Oxford University Press. ISBN 978-0-19085998-5.
- Soranzo, Giovanni (1905). 'La guerra fra Venezia e la S. Sede per il dominio di Ferrara (1308–1313) (in Italian). Città di Castello.
- Varanini, Gian Maria (1997). "Venezia e l'entroterra (1300 circa - 1420)". Storia di Venezia dalle origini alla caduta della Serenissima. Vol. III, La formazione dello stato patrizio (in Italian). Rome: Istituto della Enciclopedia Italiana. pp. 159–236.
