= Zonta (Republic of Venice) =

Institution in the Republic of Venice

In the Republic of Venice, a zonta was an extraordinary group of patricians chosen to serve alongside the elected members of the governing councils of the Republic. The purpose of this measure was as a constitutional safeguard against the accumulation of power by individuals, and to broaden the decision-making circles on important issues.

The term is the Venetian variant of aggiunta, 'addition'. The purpose of the institution was to prevent corruption and autocratic tendencies in the governing councils such as the powerful Council of Ten, but, since its members were typically chosen among patricians who had not been elected to one of these councils, it was also a "'constitutional shortcut' for those noblemen who wished to actively participate in the Venetian oligarchy but had not achieved the necessary backing". Zontas existed for the Council of Ten—originally 20 men, after 1529 reduced to 15, but the number could vary; the Venetian Senate, where a zonta of 60 adjuncts was added to the 60 regularly elected senators, nominated by senators whose terms were coming to a close; as well as extraordinary commissions of inquiry, such as the one convened to investigate the Faliero coup in 1355.

== Source ==
- Contarini, Gasparo (2020). The Republic of Venice: De magistratibus et republica Venetorum. Translated by Giuseppe Pezzini and Amanda Murphy. Edited and introduced by Filippo Sabetti. Toronto, Buffalo, London: University of Toronto Press. ISBN 978-1-4875-0584-4.
- Iordanou, Ioanna (2019). Venice's Secret Service: Organizing Intelligence in the Renaissance. Oxford: Oxford University Press. ISBN 978-0-19-879131-7.
- Lane, Frederic Chapin (1973). Venice, A Maritime Republic. Baltimore, Maryland: Johns Hopkins University Press. ISBN 0-8018-1445-6.
