= Tiepolo conspiracy =

1310 coup attempt in Venice, Italy

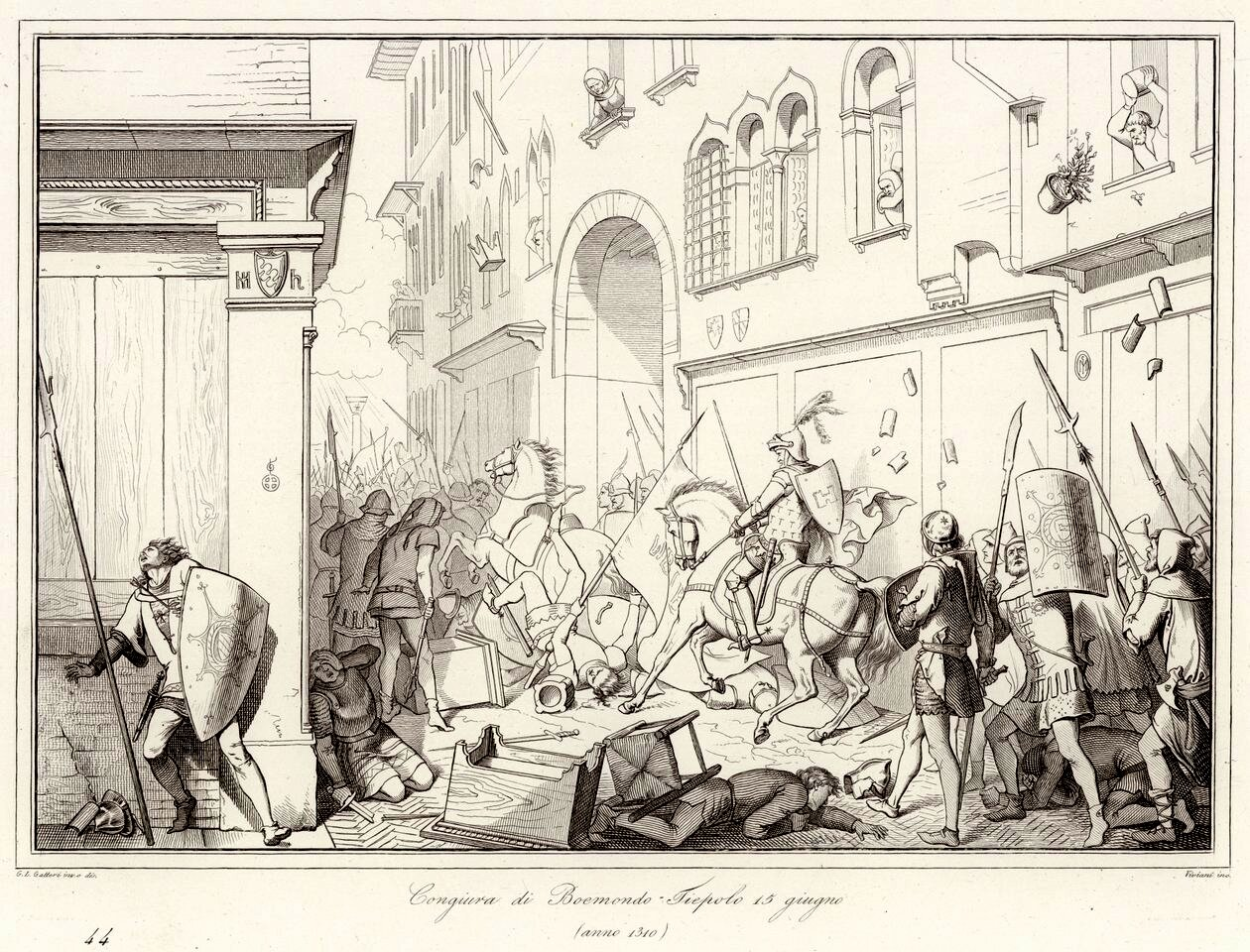
- Depiction of the armed clashes and the fall of Tiepolo's standard during the attempted coup, by Giuseppe Lorenzo Gatteri
- Duration: 15 June 1310
- Location: Venice, Republic of Venice
- Type: Coup d'état
- Cause: Rivalries between Venetian nobles, Venetian defeat in the War of Ferrara
- Organized by: Bajamonte Tiepolo; Marco Querini; Badoero Badoer
- Outcome: Failure of the coup; Death of Querini, execution of Badoer, exile of Tiepolo and other patricians; Creation of the Council of Ten

The Tiepolo conspiracy or Tiepolo-Querini conspiracy was an attempt to overthrow the government of the Republic of Venice under Doge Pietro Gradenigo. Headed by the disaffected patricians Bajamonte Tiepolo, Marco Querini, and Badoero Badoer but backed by a sizeable number of other patricians, churchmen, and commoners, the conspiracy resulted in a coup attempt on 15 June 1310, in which three columns, each led by one of the chief conspirators, were meant to converge on the Piazza San Marco, seize the Doge's Palace, and overthrow the Venetian government. Warned of the plot at the last minute, the Doge mobilized his followers and loyalist forces. Coupled with the conspirators' poor coordination, the Doge's decisive counter-action led to the coup's failure. Querini, the main driving force of the conspiracy, was killed in the subsequent fighting along with one of his sons. Badoer was captured while trying to cross the Venetian Lagoon from Padua and executed for treason. Tiepolo was pushed back and barricaded in the Rialto. The Great Council let Tiepolo and his main supporters leave in exile.

Various motives have been attributed to the conspiracy, from personal ambitions to a populist reaction to the increasingly exclusive, aristocratic nature of the Venetian state after the Serrata of the Great Council that excluded the lower classes from power. As the grandson and great-grandson of Doges and son of the commoners' candidate in the 1289 election against Pietro Gradenigo, Tiepolo was the heir to his family's perceived championship of the lower classes against Gradenigo, the candidate of the established families of the traditional aristocracy. In later times, Tiepolo was seen as a heroic champion of the people, but modern historians view the conspiracy as factional strife among the patrician elites, exaggerated by the recent and disastrous War of Ferrara and the resulting papal interdict over Venice.

After the coup's suppression, a policy of public damnation of the participants followed. The houses of Tiepolo and Querini were torn down and replaced with monuments warning against treason. Ordinary citizens who helped in resisting the coup were prominently rewarded and celebrated in subsequent legend. The Council of Ten was established to monitor the conspiracy's exiles and any attempt to subvert the Venetian regime. Initially a temporary measure, the Council proved efficient, and was made permanent, becoming one of the most powerful institutions of the Venetian government.

== Background ==
In the 13th century, the government of the Republic of Venice relied on a series of councils. At the base was the general assembly of the people, which met rarely to ratify legislation. Then followed the Great Council, which was responsible for electing all magistrates and the members of the higher councils. As a result, it was the Great Council rather than the Assembly that held power, but even so, the Great Council was too large and unwieldy for effective deliberation and government. Two other, smaller councils, the Council of Forty and the Senate, provided deliberation and took most decisions in policy. The executive was headed by the Ducal Council and the Doge of Venice, along with the three heads of the Forty. Although chosen for life and enjoying great prestige and authority, the office of Doge was not hereditary and its power was carefully restricted to prevent it from becoming a monarchy.

Venetian politics had traditionally been dominated by an aristocratic upper class, the patricians. In the second half of the 13th century, this aristocratic predominance was challenged by the middle class commoners, wealthy merchants and artisans, who had the backing of the lower classes. At the same time, within the aristocracy itself, factions began to emerge around the Tiepolo and Dandolo families and their respective adherents, when Giacomo Tiepolo won election as Doge in 1229 through a tie-break castling of lots against Marino Dandolo. The Tiepolo represented the newly prominent families that had risen in the aftermath of the Fourth Crusade and the expansion of Venice's commercial and colonial overseas empire, as well as middle-class artisans and guilds, while the Dandolo represented the established old aristocracy.

The challenge posed by the commoners, possibly in alliance with a populist Doge, spurred the ruling oligarchs to reforms to limit the Doge's power through the six ducal councillors—who were meant to not only serve as the Doge's advisors, but also as checks to his authority as they were able to veto his decisions—instituting prohibitions on bearing arms in the Piazza San Marco or the vicinity of the Doge's Palace, and restrictions on the activities of guilds and their members, effectively destroying their political power. In order to defuse factional rivalries and prevent the repetition of 1229, the measures also included the creation of an elaborate system for the election of the Doge, although on its very first application in 1268, Giacomo's son Lorenzo Tiepolo was elected; much to the rejoicing of the commoners and the chagrin of the old elites. Once in office, however, Lorenzo Tiepolo adopted a moderate course, reconciling with his rival (and eventual successor as Doge) Giovanni Dandolo and upholding the restriction placed on the guilds by his predecessor. When Dandolo died in 1289, the commoners loudly proclaimed their support for Lorenzo Tiepolo's son Giacomo, but the latter's very popularity, along with the threat of a quasi-dynastic succession of a son and grandson of doges, resulted in the election of Pietro Gradenigo, scion of one of the great aristocratic houses.

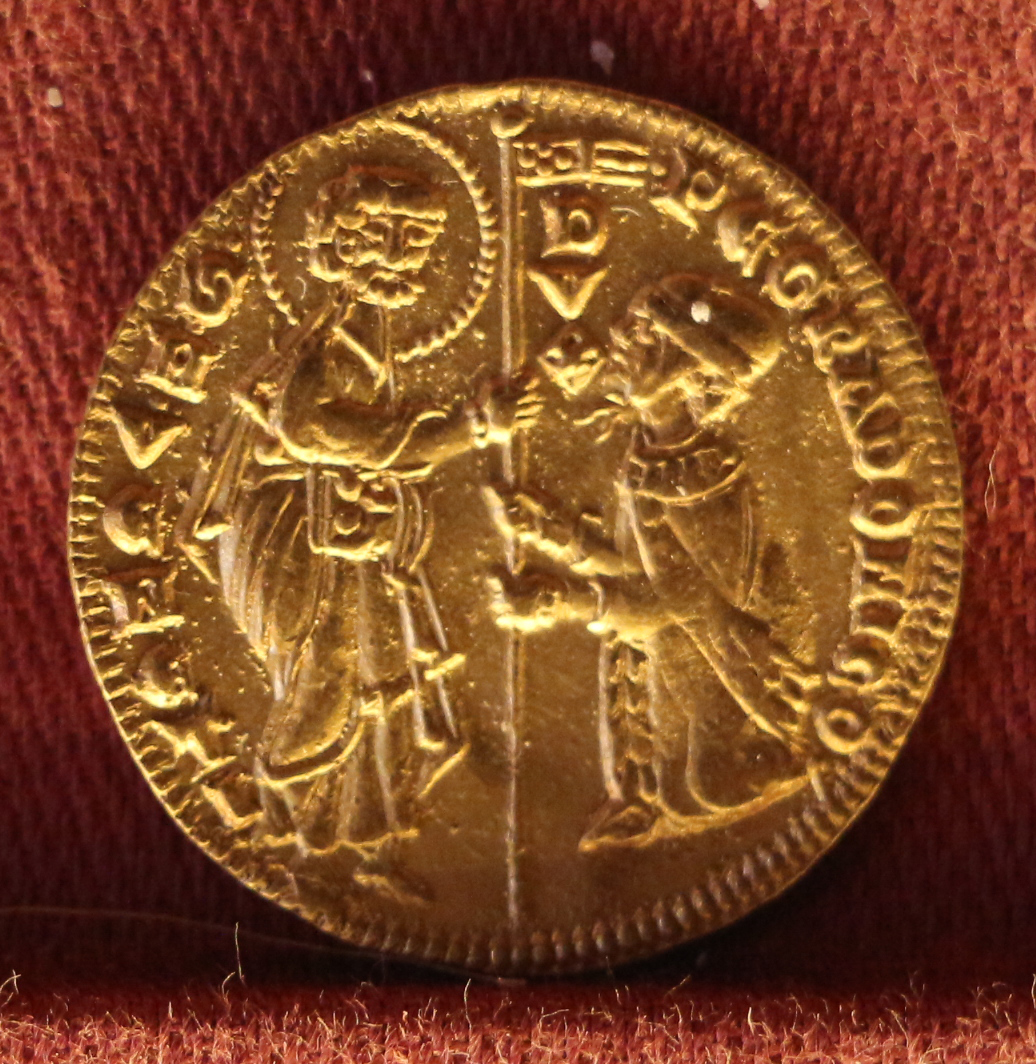
Gold zecchino with Doge Pietro Gradenigo kneeling before Venice's patron saint, St. Mark

Gradenigo's long tenure as Doge was not tranquil nor very successful in foreign policy. A conflict with Venice's traditional rival, Genoa, ended inconclusively after the Venetians suffered a shattering defeat at the Battle of Curzola in 1298, and while a brief conflict with Padua over Venice's salt extraction monopoly was more successful, the Doge's 1306 treaty with Charles, Count of Valois to launch a crusade for the conquest of Constantinople from the Byzantine Empire and the re-establishment of the Latin Empire with Charles as emperor went nowhere. Gradenigo also spearheaded, ignoring the other executive councils of the Venetian government, the disastrous attempt to capture Ferrara in 1308–1309, which led to a papal interdict and resulted in severe financial losses and a humiliating retreat for the Republic. Venice was simultaneously also embroiled in conflict with the Patriarchate of Aquileia (1309) and faced a revolt in the Dalmatian city of Zara (1310).

Domestically, Gradenigo presided over a major reform of the Great Council. Until then, membership to the council was ex officio, while other members were nominated by a board of four men chosen by lot. While dominated by aristocrats, there were also commoners in the council, as well as Venetian citizens born overseas or recent immigrants. In 1297, in the so-called Serrata (lit. 'lockout') of the Great Council, membership was restricted to those families already holding or having held membership in the previous four years. This measure increased the size of the council and broadened the Venetian ruling class. Initially the admission of new members was allowed, but was soon heavily restricted; by 1323, membership was essentially hereditary, and thus the new dividing line between nobles and commoners. In the long term, the Serrata not only served to exclude the commoners from power, but also helped address rivalries among the patrician elites, by enlarging membership to such a degree that the council could not be dominated by a single faction, and conversely guaranteeing the elites a seat at the table, thus helping Venice avoid the zero-sum factional conflicts plaguing other Italian cities of the time. The Serrata was soon challenged by those excluded from the Great Council: a conspiracy was led by the commoner Marino Boccono in 1300 but little detail is known about it other than that it failed and its members were condemned to death. At least one later source however claims that the Boccono's followers were unhappy at the election of Gradenigo as Doge over Giacomo Tiepolo.

== Conspiracy ==
By 1310, the impact of the Ferrarese war and the Serrata had polarized Venetian society into two opposed parties. The divisions came to the fore during a debate of the Great Council on the Ferrarese question in October 1308, when the papal interdict was announced: the debate descended into chaos, as insults and even blows were exchanged. The two factions even adopted the "Guelph" (pro-papal) and "Ghibelline" (anti-papal) labels that had been current in Italian politics for the past two centuries but not otherwise seen in Venice until then; in Venice they reflected less sympathy for the papacy and more an anti-government and pro-government affiliation respectively. While generally restricting the eligibility for Venetian citizenship and high office, Gradenigo's government was generous with its supporters and allies: in the aftermath of the Bocho affair, the government gave membership in the Great Council to fifteen prominent commoner families that had shown loyalty to the regime, while foreign potentates like Marquis Fresco d'Este, Lord of Ferrara in northern Italy and Count Doimo of Veglia in Dalmatia were given the privilege of bearing arms in public. Much of the opposition's ire focused on Doge Gradenigo, who was held personally responsible for the Republic's state of affairs—arguably so for the Ferrarese war, less justifiably so in the case of the Serrata, as he was mostly the figurehead for the conservative aristocrats who had sponsored his election and were the driving force behind the changes to the Great Council.

In 1310, a conspiracy was formed against Gradenigo and his government, spearheaded by three patricians: Bajamonte Tiepolo, son of Gradenigo's rival Giacomo and grandson and great-grandson of the two Tiepolo doges, his father-in-law Marco Querini, and Badoero Badoer. Not much is known about Marco Querini's life, and he appears to have held but a few political offices, although he served as envoy to Padua during the salt war. His family had extensive estates in Ferrara and Polesine, and were landholders rather than merchants, thus at odds with most of the Venetian aristocracy of the time, and liable to take a more pro-papal stance. He had fought without success in the War of Ferrara in summer 1309 and been captured by Alboino I della Scala, lord of Verona; pro-government figures held him responsible for the loss of Castel Tedaldo in Ferrara, and the Republic did not seek his release until January 1310. Marco was joined by his brothers, Pietro, and Giacomo. Pietro, who had formerly served as Bailo of Negroponte, was of an irascible temper and had most recently gotten into trouble by assaulting a member of the Morosini family—among Gradenigo's chief supporters—who as head of the night watch tried to inspect him for carrying concealed weapons. Giacomo on the other hand had a record of public opposition to Gradenigo and his policies stretching back to the Doge's election, but was by inclination a moderate. Badoero Badoer was the brother of Marco Querini's wife, Maria. Both Badoero and his brother, Marino, had married into families from Padua and its region. In 1309, when Count Doimo of Veglia was elected ducal councillor, Marco and Jacopo Querini led the opposition to this against the Michiel and Giustinian families, leading to a stormy debate and even scuffles in the Great Council, as the Querini brothers and Badoero Badoer brought up a law of 1267 that prohibited the Dalmatian nobles from holding seats in the Great Council or the Senate. The measure nevertheless passed, which deepened the political rift further.

As the oldest and most eminent representative of the "Guelph" faction, and further embittered over his being scapegoated over the failures of the Ferrarese war, Marco Querini was the driving force of the anti-government conspiracy. He was however elderly, being born c. 1245, and thus chose his son-in-law as the revolt's figurehead. Tiepolo was young and popular with the common people, who called him the 'Great Cavalier' and idolized him on account of his illustrious ancestry. His official career began inauspiciously, as he was convicted of embezzling a large sum of money during his tenure as governor of Modon and Coron, where he had lived in a lavish fashion more suited to a prince than a Venetian official. Some modern historians support the notion that the conviction was the result of blatant manipulation by the rival Dandolo family, but historian Frederic C. Lane considers Tiepolo as "the kind of man who justified the aristocracy's fear of giving too much prestige to one family". Although Tiepolo was elected to the Council of Forty in 1304, in the subsequent years he appears to have withdrawn from politics to his country villa near Treviso. The conspirators amassed a considerable following: 77 patricians took part from no fewer than 28 families (although the Querini, Tiepolo, Badoer, and Barozzi provided almost half of them), along with 23 clerics and unknown numbers of commoners. The motives of both leaders and followers are unclear, and were likely as diverse as the plot's membership. Querini and Tiepolo had personal grievances, while some of the patricians, including Badoer and the Querini, also had extensive estates in Ferrara and possibly shared opposition to the war. The conspirators from the clergy were likely also driven by opposition to the war that had brought the papal interdict, while the commoners may have been motivated by patronage ties to patricians, opposition to the costly war of which they bore the brunt of losses, or by the image of the Tiepolos as champions of the common folk and Bajamonte as the man to reverse the Serrata once in power.

The leading conspirators—Tiepolo, Badoer, and the Querini brothers and a few others—met in the first week of June 1310 at the Querini palace to discuss their next moves. Marco Querini launched a diatribe against Gradenigo, followed by Tiepolo, who after revisiting the injustices heaped upon them by the current regime, urged them to move to practical measures to "obtain a good prince, who might preserve the national liberty". This course was steadfastly objected to by Jacopo Querini, recently appointed ambassador to Constantinople, who was reluctant to risk his and his family's lives on such a risky endeavour and argued for prudence and moderation. Despite several attempts to win him over, he would only be satisfied by a pledge that they would abandon such plans, else he threatened to lay down his ambassadorship; in the end, the other conspirators agreed to give him that pledge. As soon as Jacopo departed, however, they resumed their deliberations to mount a coup and install Tiepolo as ruler by force of arms. Apart from their own supporters in the city, Badoer was to make use of his family's influence in Padua—many Badoers had resided in the suburb of Peraga or held office in the local commune—to gather men for the coup.

== Attempted coup ==
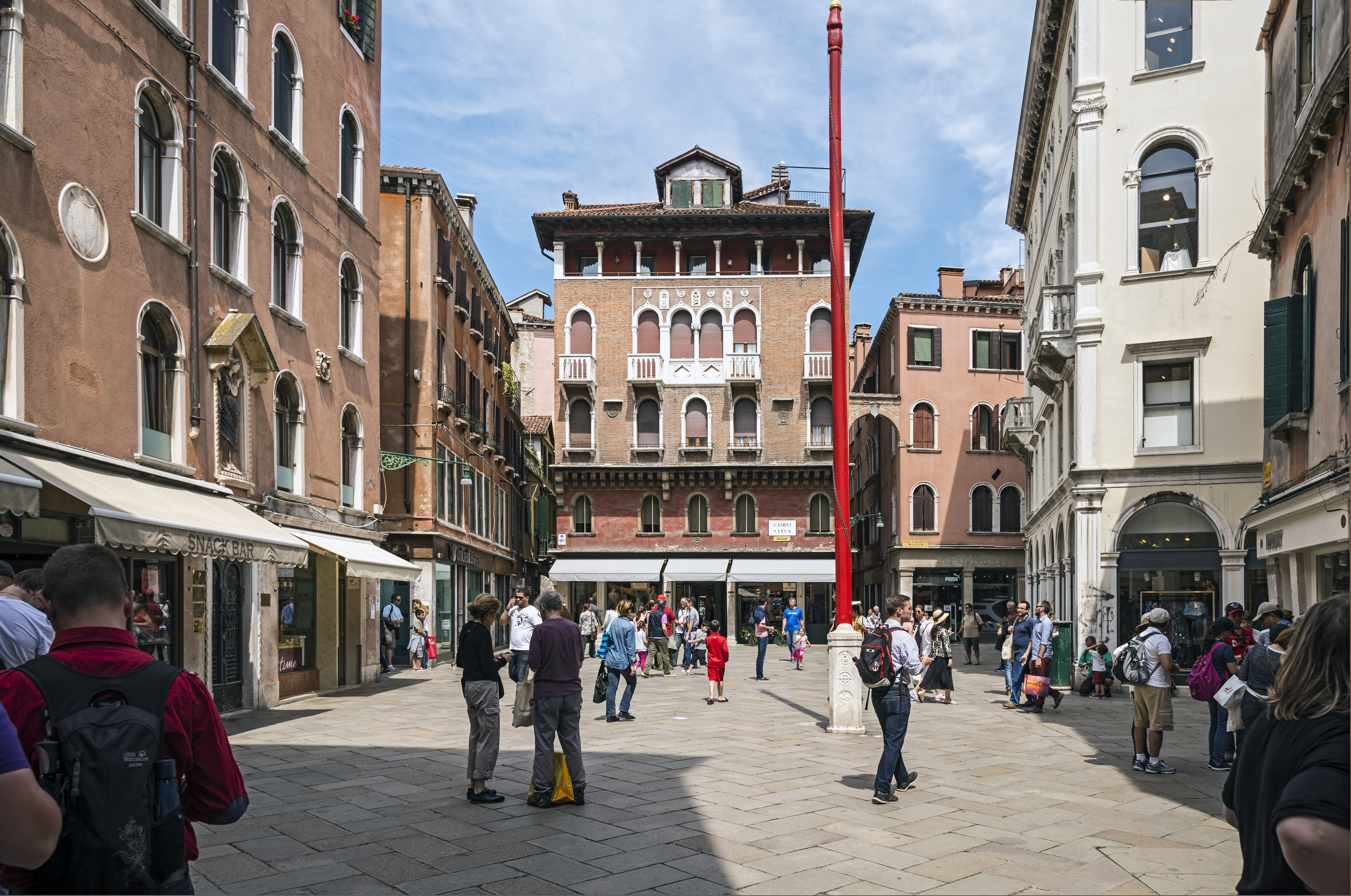
Campo San Luca in 2016

On 14 June, Badoer left for Peraga, where his men had gathered, while the others began to gather at the Querini and Tiepolo palaces. Initially planned for the same night, the execution of the coup was postponed for the dawn of the next day, the feast of Saint Vitus. The conspirators and their men, amidst cries of "Liberty" and "Death to Doge Gradenigo" divided into two columns that would converge on the Piazza San Marco and seize the Doge's Palace: one headed by Tiepolo, approaching from the Mercerie area, and the other, led by Marco Querini and his sons Nicolò and Benedetto, starting from the San Moisè area. The conspirators failed to heed the weather, with heavy rain delaying Badoer and his men in crossing the Brenta River and the Venetian Lagoon, as well as possible opposition: on the night of 14 June, Doge Gradenigo was warned by a commoner, Marco Donato, who informed him of the conspirators' plans. The Doge reacted with alacrity: all senior officials of the state were summoned to him—apart from one, Andrea Doro, who had resigned and joined the rebels—called upon his followers and friends to arm themselves and their servants and come to the Piazza San Marco, barricaded the square's entry points. Antonio Dandolo and Baldovino Dolfino were named as the Doge's lieutenants, while orders went out to the governors of the nearby islands of the Lagoon, Murano, Torcello, and Chioggia, to raise their militia and come to Venice as soon as possible.

The forces thus gathered by the Doge were not very numerous, but they were unknown to the conspirators, who furthermore failed to coordinate the movements of the different columns. As a result, the Querini column arrived at the square first and was shocked to encounter a formed body of men laying in wait. A brief standoff ensued as both sides encountered each other, broken when the loyalists under Marco Giustiniani launched their attack on Querini's men with loud cries. In the ensuing battle amidst the raging thunderstorm, Marco Querini and his son Benedetto were killed, and his supporters dispersed. Many of Querini's followers tried to reform at Campo San Luca, but volunteers from the religious confraternity of the Scuola Grande della Carità and the painters' guild set upon them and dispersed them again, taking many prisoner.

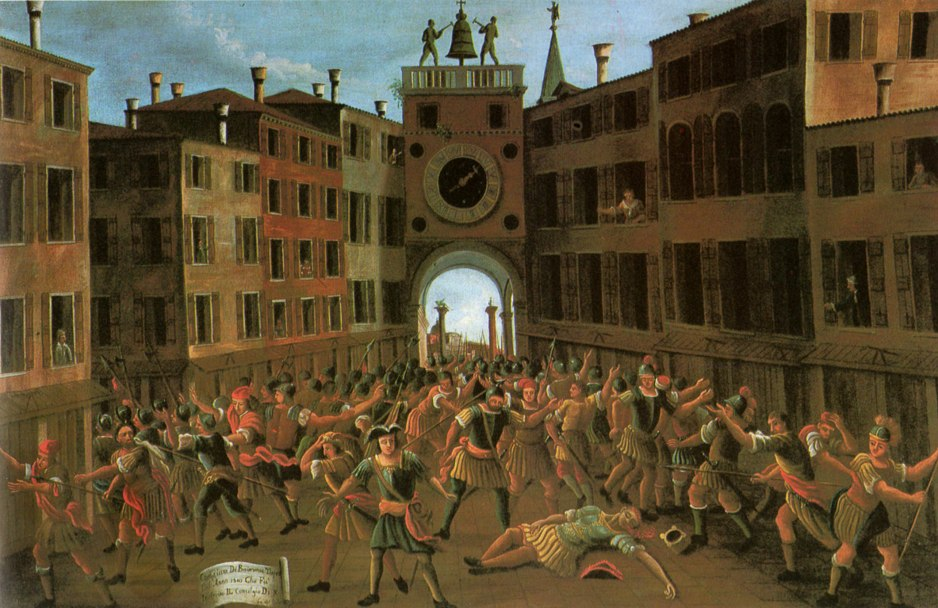
Painting of the clashes during the coup by Gabriele Bella; the painting anachronistically shows the St Mark's Clocktower, which was erected in the late 15th century

Tiepolo, in the meantime, had moved much slower than his father-in-law, as his supporters had stopped to plunder the public treasury, so that combined with Badoer's delay the loyalists were afforded the advantage of dealing with each rebel force in isolation. According to one report, some Milanese merchants appeared before Tiepolo and tried to offer to mediate with the Doge, but Tiepolo, as yet unaware of Querini's death and Badoer's delay, rejected it. Tiepolo and his men had barely reached the Church of Saint Julian in the Merceria when they were informed of what had befallen the Querini column. Tiepolo hesitated, seeking refuge from the rain and holding council under a large elder tree; but in the end he decided to press on regardless, hoping to gain a decisive victory before the arrival of the loyalist reinforcements from Chioggia. Tiepolo thus divided his own men in two so as to attack the square from two sides, one proceeding on the original course along the Merceria and the other coming from the direction of San Basso. The ensuing fight was fierce and bloody, with the rebel troops being pelted with stones from the windows by the local inhabitants, until they began to retreat. At this point took place an event which entered Venetian folklore: close to where the St Mark's Clocktower now stands, a commoner, named Giustina or Lucia Rossi, threw down a heavy stone mortar at Tiepolo. It failed its target but hit the rebels' standard-bearer on the head and killed him. The man fell down and the standard, bearing the inscription 'Liberty', went down with him, disheartening the rebels who began to flee.

By the afternoon, Tiepolo and many of his men managed to withdraw to the Rialto market area, torching the offices of the Cinque alla Pace and Ufficio del Frumento boards, though not before securing a large sum of money from the latter; they then crossed the wooden Rialto Bridge, tore or burned it down to delay pursuit, and occupied and barricaded the buildings on the other side. Securely ensconced beyond the Grand Canal, Tiepolo awaited the arrival of Badoer's reinforcements, but in vain: Badoer and his men were confronted while trying to cross the Lagoon on their way to Venice and quickly defeated by the loyalist podestà of Chioggia, Ugolino Giustinian, with Badoer himself being taken prisoner. Badoer's capture ruined any chances Tiepolo may have still had for success, but he still a strong position that would require much bloodshed to take. As a result, during the evening the Doge sent offers of a negotiated settlement to Tiepolo. The first embassy was rejected, but at length the aged and respected ducal councillor Filippo Belegno managed to persuade Tiepolo to accept terms.

The terms, confirmed by the Great Council on 17 June, were that Tiepolo and his most prominent followers—those being members of the Great Council or holding rank sufficient for a candidacy—would leave the city unharmed and stay in exile in designated places in Dalmatia or northern Italy for four years; the exiles were forbidden from approaching Zara, Padua, Vicenza, Treviso, or from finding refuge in any territory hostile to the Republic. The commoners that followed the patricians into rebellion were amnestied, provided that they declared their submission to the government, and all treasure or other property looted during the uprising was to be restored to the state or the private owners. The exception was Badoer, since he not only had participated in a conspiracy, but engaged in high treason by hiring foreigners and risking another war between Venice and Padua. On 18 June, he was tried and condemned by the Council of Forty, and on the 22nd a session of the Great Council ordered his decapitation. His Paduan accomplices were likewise tried and condemned on the next day, with most also being executed as a result. Marco Querini's surviving son, Nicolò, managed to escape to Treviso and thence join Tiepolo in exile.

== Aftermath ==
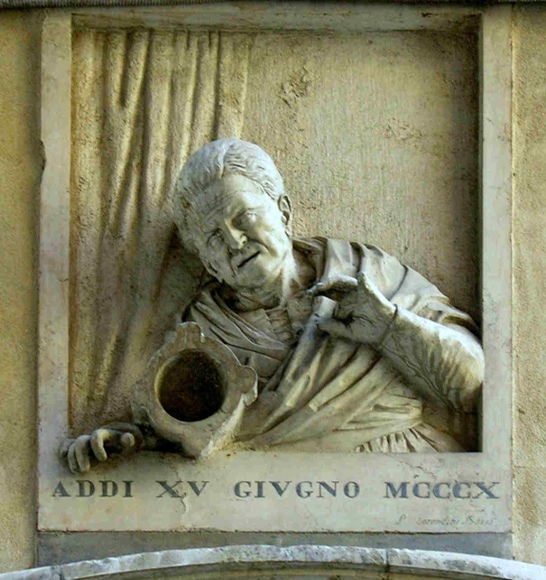
Plaque commemorating the Vecia del Morter, preparing to throw the mortar that cast down Tiepolo's standard-bearer

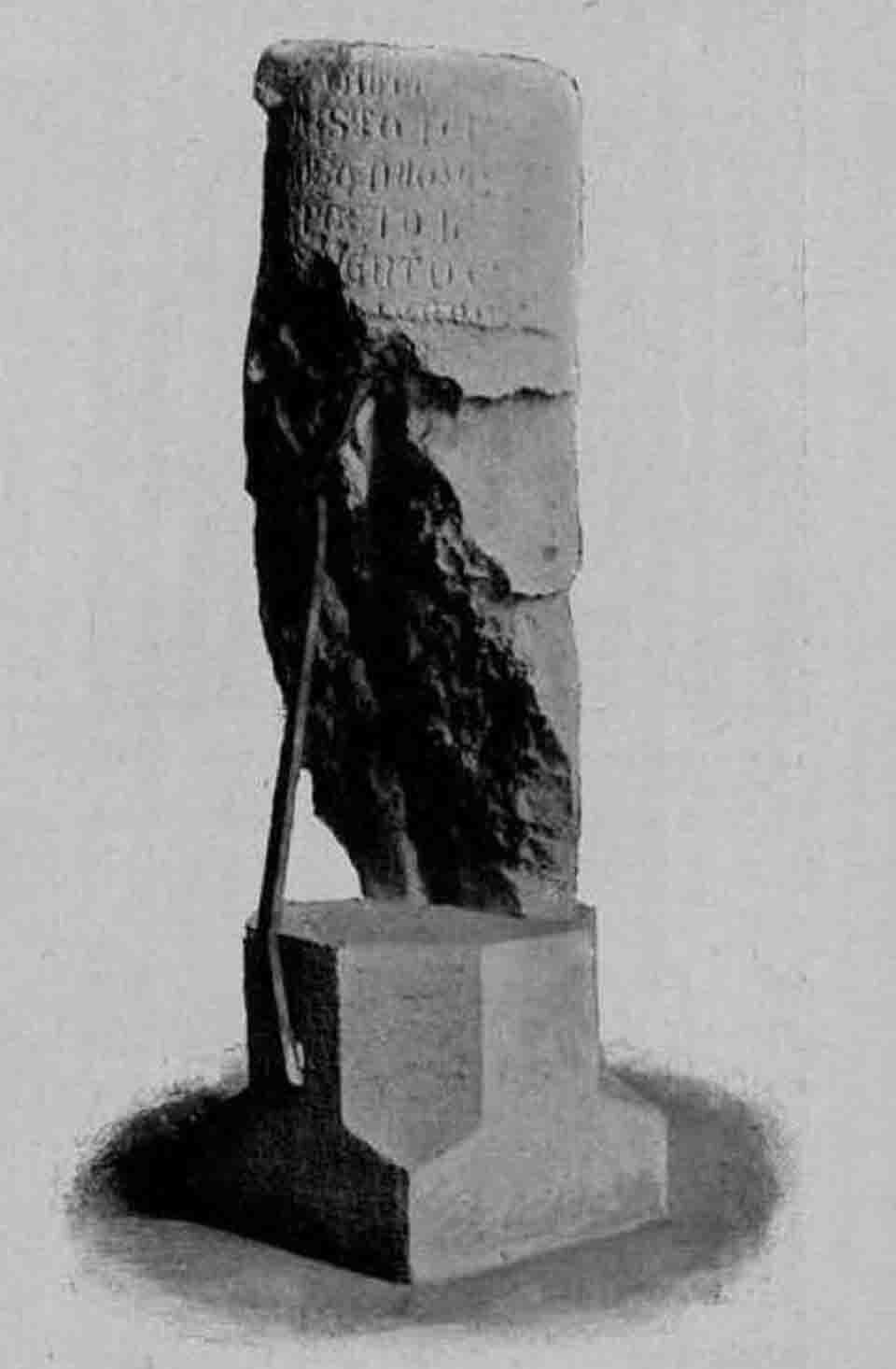
Colomon of infamy Bajamonte Tiepolo

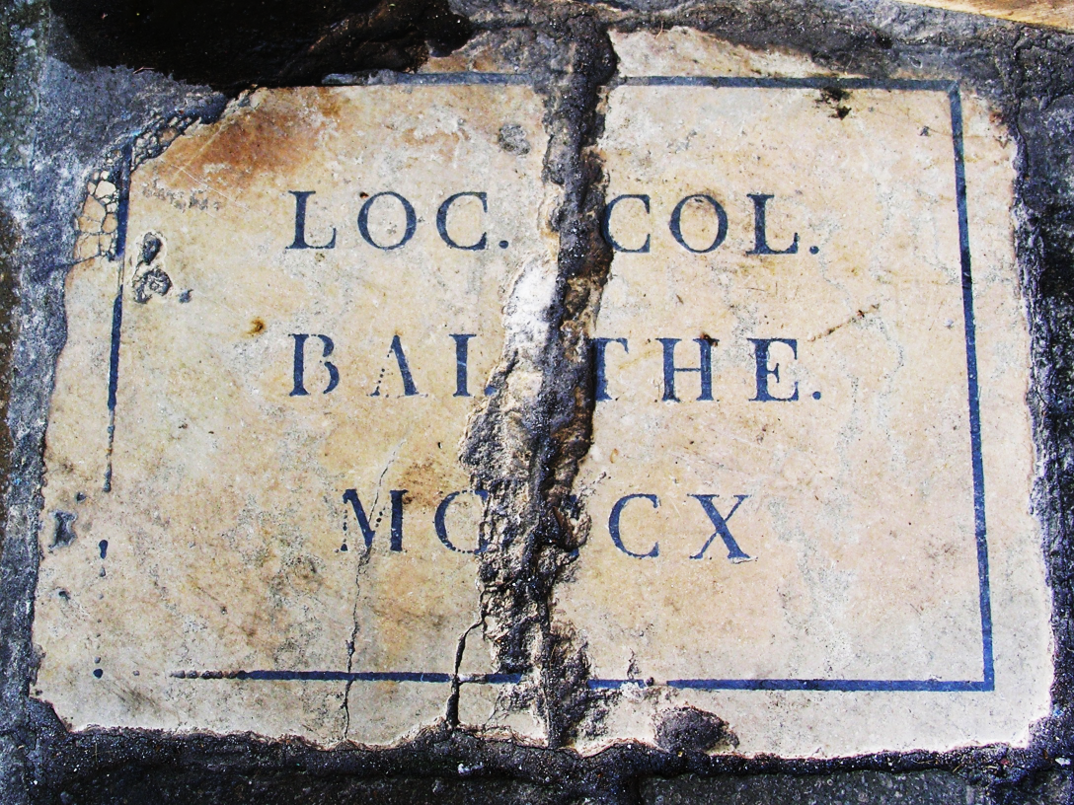
The marker that replaced the Colomon of infamy Bajamonte Tiepolo

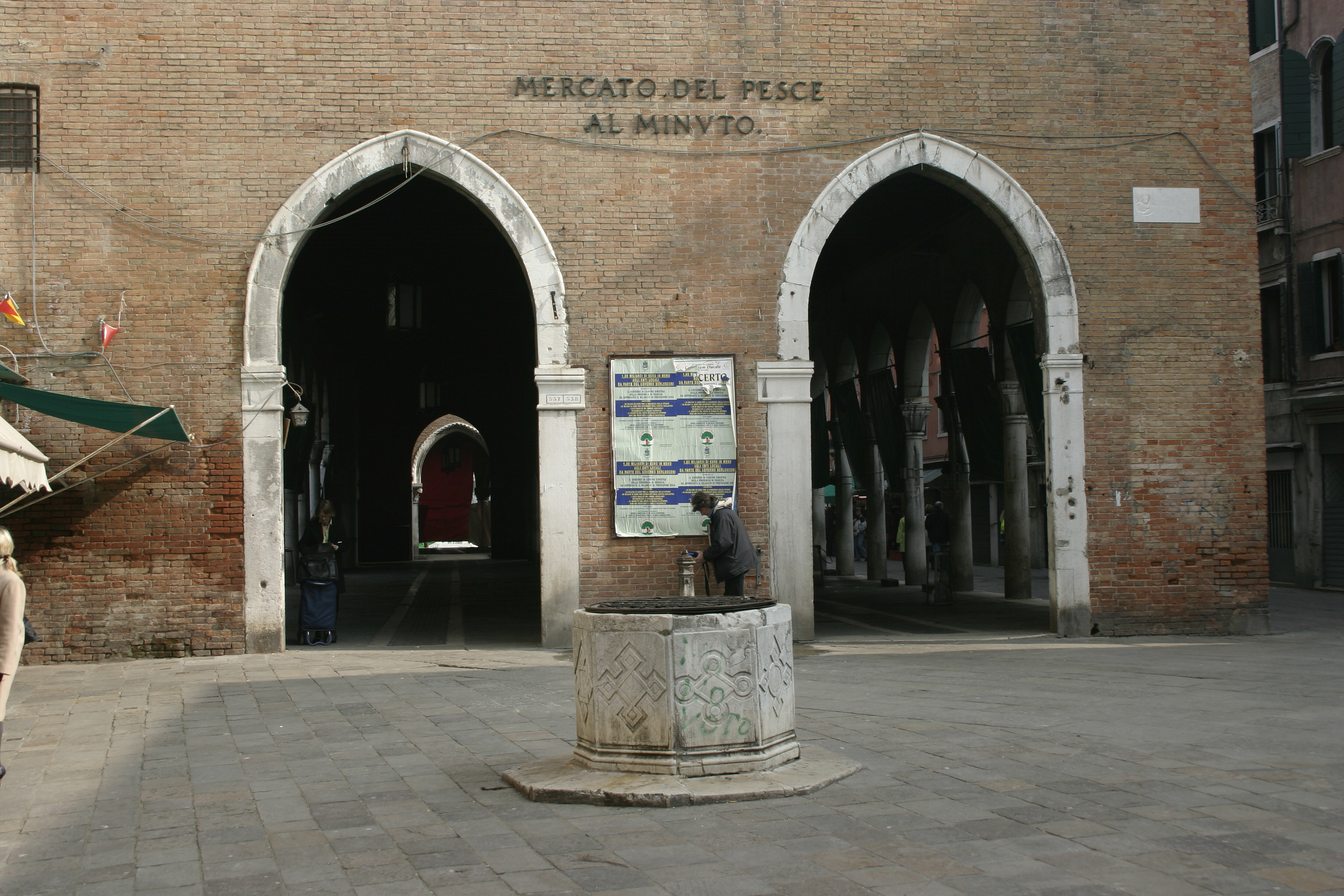
The arches of the Fish Market facing Campo delle Beccarie are said to have come from the Querini palace, demolished after their participation in the conspiracy.

Gradenigo lost no time in conveying the news of the coup's defeat to the Venetian officials overseas, as well as putting his own spin on events, demonizing Tiepolo—described as "the vilest traitor and seducer of iniquities"—and his followers, who were dismissed as "exiles, foreigners, and rogues". The wives of those condemned or exiled were also banished from the city and all its dominions for the duration of their husbands' lives; Venice and its subject lands within eight days. They were not permitted to return while their husbands were alive, or they remarried to someone else. The exiles who obeyed the terms of their exile were allowed to retain their rights, but those that did not were branded traitors and persecuted. Among them was Tiepolo and his closest followers, who quickly began to plot against the Republic: in 1311, Tiepolo was in Padua plotting with local magnates, while in 1325 he was at Zara and in contact with Bologna. Orders went out to the Venetian governors in Dalmatia to have him captured, and in January 1329, the Venetians decided to assassinate him. Tiepolo died sometime after that, possibly being assassinated. Other followers of Tiepolo were even less fortunate: Nicolò Querini was captured in 1320 and executed at Padua, and his wife was confined to a nunnery; while the patrician Stefano Manolesso, who had covertly met Tiepolo, was sentenced to death.

The palaces of Tiepolo and Querini were ordered torn down as a sign of their infamy. Tiepolo's was levelled on 25 July 1310. In 1364, during the Revolt of Saint Titus in Crete, a column was erected with the inscription: "This plot of land was Baiamonte's and now, because of his evil betrayal, it has been made common land to frighten others, and forever show all people [the benefits of] good sense". A follower of Tiepolo's, Francesco Fantebon, later tore down the column, being punished for this with cutting off of a hand, blinding, and exile. The column was re-erected, and is now in the Museo Correr. A plaque is still present at the column's former location, with the Latin inscription "loc[us] col[umnae] bai[amontis] the[upoli] MCCCX". The demolition of the Querini Ca' Grande palace was delayed, as it was commonly owned by Marco and his two brothers, Pietro and Giovanni Querini; while Pietro was involved in the conspiracy, Giovanni was not. Unable to clearly delineate the boundaries of the brothers' properties, in the end, the government bought out Giovanni's share in the house, and tore it down except for two arches that were incorporated in 1339 in the building of the Ufficiali alle Beccherie, the officials responsible for supervising the butchers. Finally, in December 1310 all other members of the Tiepolo and Querini families were ordered to change their coats of arms, and take responsibility for effacing all the older versions throughout the city.

The day of Saint Vitus was declared a public holiday in memory of the "salvation of the Republic", celebrated with a procession led by the Doge to the—now destroyed—Church of Saint Vitus, which was embellished with the pilasters of Tiepolo's palace, as well as new altar vessels. Commoners who had remained loyal or participated in the revolt's suppression were generously and conspicuously rewarded: some of the more prominent commoners were enrolled in the Great Council, while others received minor offices or other advantages and preferments. Giustina or Lucia Rossi's act—likely at least partly legendary—was celebrated as evidence of popular adherence to the Republic's institutions, and she and her descendants were granted the honour of displaying the Gonfalon of Saint Mark yearly on the feast of Saint Vitus, while the rent of her house, which belonged to the Procurators of Saint Mark, ceased to be collected until the Fall of the Republic of Venice in 1797. A plaque of Rossi, celebrated in legend as the Vecia del Morter or Vecchia del Mortajo ("crone of the mortar") with the date 15 June 1310 was placed in the Mercerie in 1841, while a piece of white marble in the pavement is traditionally held to be where Tiepolo's standard-bearer died. Similarly, the Scuola Grande della Carità, along with the painters' guild, who had helped battle Querini's followers at Campo San Luca, were allowed to hoist their corporations' emblems next to the banner of Saint Mark on that site.

The most important and long-term consequence of the revolt, however, was the establishment of the Council of Ten. The numerous and influential exiles of the revolt had to be monitored lest they become a threat to the Republic. This was the case in several other contemporary Italian city-states, like Genoa or Florence, where the exiles plotted over generations to overthrow the victorious factions in their own civil conflicts; the Ghibelline Genoese exiles even formed their own government in exile and waged war on their own city. As a result, the Council of Ten was founded on 10 July 1310 in order to monitor the activities of the exiled conspirators in place of the Council of Forty. Initially a temporary expedient, it soon proved its efficacy in thwarting any reaction to patrician rule as well as the formation of factions within the ruling elite. Being a small body, it was able to act more speedily, and with more secrecy, compared to the much larger, and therefore slower, councils like the Great Council or the Senate. As a result, its existence was extended again and again until it was made a permanent institution of the Republic in 1339, the last among the major executive councils of the Venetian state to be established.

== Historiography ==
The conspiracy has been variously regarded in history, depending on one's position towards the aristocratic Venetian regime. In most Venetian historiography Tiepolo was always "the vilest of traitors", a view reinforced by the popularization of legends like the Vecia del Morter, which showed the commoners defending the established aristocratic regime, and commemorated in the annual processions and festivities, both secular and religious, that demonstrated the unity of the Venetian people. Others, however, saw the uprising an attempt to restore popular liberties against an oligarchy that was actively entrenching its privileges and excluding the lower classes from power. This interpretation was first forwarded by the Venetian politician and historian Nicolò Trevisan, who had himself served in the Ten during the failed Faliero coup of 1355. Trevisan saw in Tiepolo's movement a reaction to the Serrata, which in Trevisan's view had been directed against the common people. During the 18th century, amidst the Age of Enlightenment and the Republic of Venice's increasingly apparent stagnation and decline, with reform proposals repeatedly stymied by the Ten and the State Inquisitors, the view of Tiepolo as a champion of the people gained currency. During the French Revolution, the Jacobins viewed Tiepolo as a hero, and after the Fall of the Republic of Venice and during the French occupation of the city in 1797, Tiepolo was not only rehabilitated but also celebrated by the revolutionary democratic regime. Modern historians generally see the episode as a factional conflict within the Venetian elites, and reject any notion that Tiepolo sought to reverse the Serrata. As Lane points out, while Tiepolo enjoyed widespread popularity, there is no evidence that the commoners moved in any numbers to support his coup, and if it had been successful, it is more likely that Venice would have turned into a one-man princely rule (signoria), as was the case in many other Italian city-states at the time.

== Sources ==
- Faugeron, Fabien (1997). "Quelques réflexions autour de la conjuration de Baiamonte Tiepolo Des réalités socio-politiques à la fabrication du mythe (1297-1797)". In Fontana, Alessandro; Saro, George (eds.). Venise 1297–1797: la république des Castors (in French). Lyon: ENS Éditions. pp. 37–71. ISBN 978-2-902126-29-3.
- Gullino, Giuseppe (2016). "QUERINI, Marco". Dizionario Biografico degli Italiani (in Italian). Vol. 86: Querenghi–Rensi. Rome: Istituto dell'Enciclopedia Italiana. ISBN 978-88-12-00032-6.
- Hazlitt, W. Carew (1915). The Venetian Republic: Its Rise, its Growth, and its Fall, 421–1797. Volume I, 409–1457 (Fourth ed.). London: Adam and Charles Black.
- Lane, Frederic Chapin (1973). Venice: A Maritime Republic. Baltimore, Maryland: Johns Hopkins University Press. ISBN 0-8018-1445-6.
- Nicol, Donald M. (1988). Byzantium and Venice: A Study in Diplomatic and Cultural Relations. Cambridge: Cambridge University Press. ISBN 0-521-34157-4.
- Pozza, Marco (2019). "TIEPOLO, Lorenzo". Dizionario Biografico degli Italiani (in Italian). Vol. 95: Taranto–Togni. Rome: Istituto dell'Enciclopedia Italiana. ISBN 978-88-12-00032-6.
- Ravegnani, Giorgio (2017). Il traditore di Venezia: Vita di Marino Falier doge (in Italian). Bari and Rome: Editori Laterza. ISBN 978-88-581-2715-5.
- Romano, Dennis (2024). Venice: The Remarkable History of the Lagoon City. Oxford and New York: Oxford University Press. ISBN 978-0-19085998-5.
- Rossi, Franco (2002). "GRADENIGO, Pietro". Dizionario Biografico degli Italiani (in Italian). Vol. 58: Gonzales–Graziani. Rome: Istituto dell'Enciclopedia Italiana. ISBN 978-88-12-00032-6.
