= Marino Zorzi =

Doge of Venice from 1311 to 1312

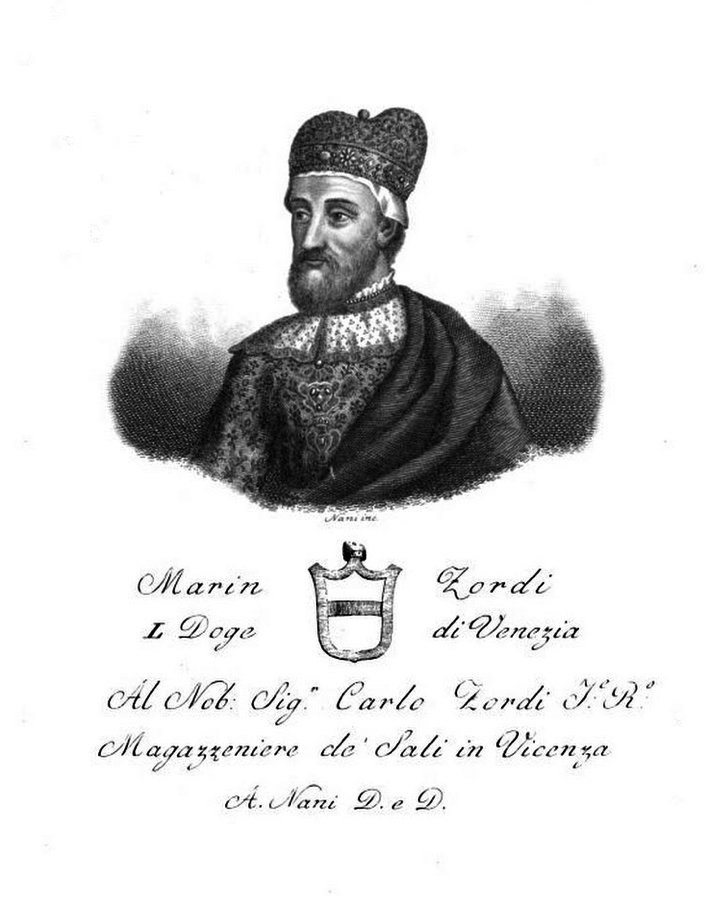
- Portrait, nineteenth-century copper engraving

Doge of Venice
- In office 1311–1312
- Preceded by: Pietro Gradenigo
- Succeeded by: Giovanni Soranzo

Personal details
- Born: c. 1231
- Died: 3 July 1312 (aged 80–81)

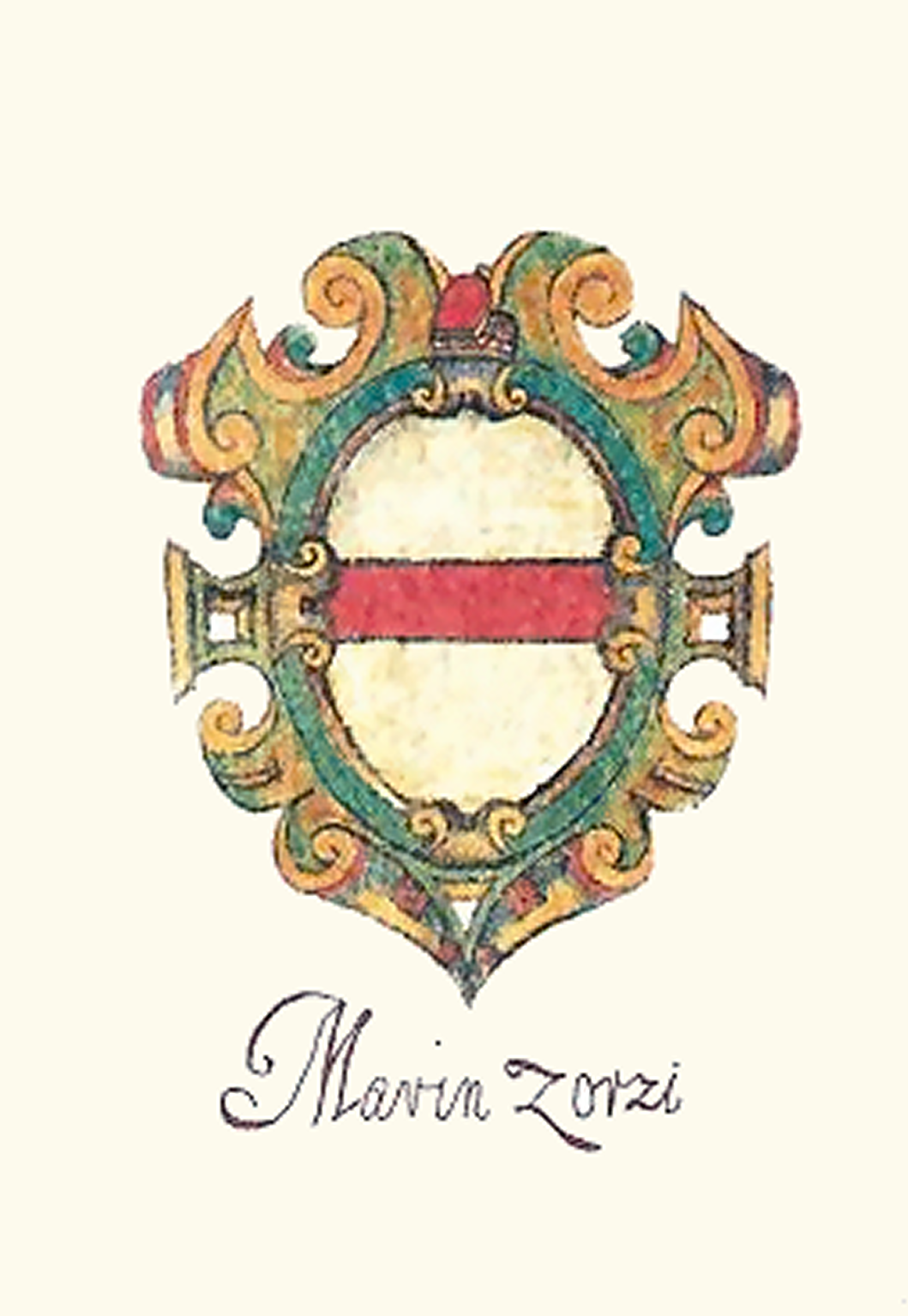
Coat of arms of Marino Zorzi

Marino Zorzi (c. 1231 – 3 July 1312), born in Venice, was the 50th Doge of the Republic of Venice, from 23 August 1311 until his death. He was married to Agneta Querini. Considered to have been a devout man, he had served as an ambassador to Rome. He may have been elected to decrease tensions in the city caused by the attempted revolt of Bajamonte Tiepolo as well as tensions with Rome, still angry with Venice over her occupation of the city of Ferrara (1308–09).

Zorzi had not been the first choice as Doge; Stefano Giustinian had been chosen first, but had refused the honor. The elderly Zorzi did not succeed in re-establishing good relations with the Papacy and his short reign was characterized by several natural calamities. His reign lasted only eleven months, and Zorzi, considered a saint in his lifetime, died in 1312. His garments were sought after as holy relics.

His dogaressa, Agnese, is known to have intervened to have the silk-masters of Lucca train apprentices and supervise the production of silk fabrics in the workshops of the Venetian fraglia.

Political offices
Preceded by Pietro Gradenigo	Doge of Venice; 1311–1312	Succeeded by Giovanni Soranzo
