= Rialto Bridge =

Bridge in Venice, Italy

Rialto Bridge Italian: Ponte di Rialto
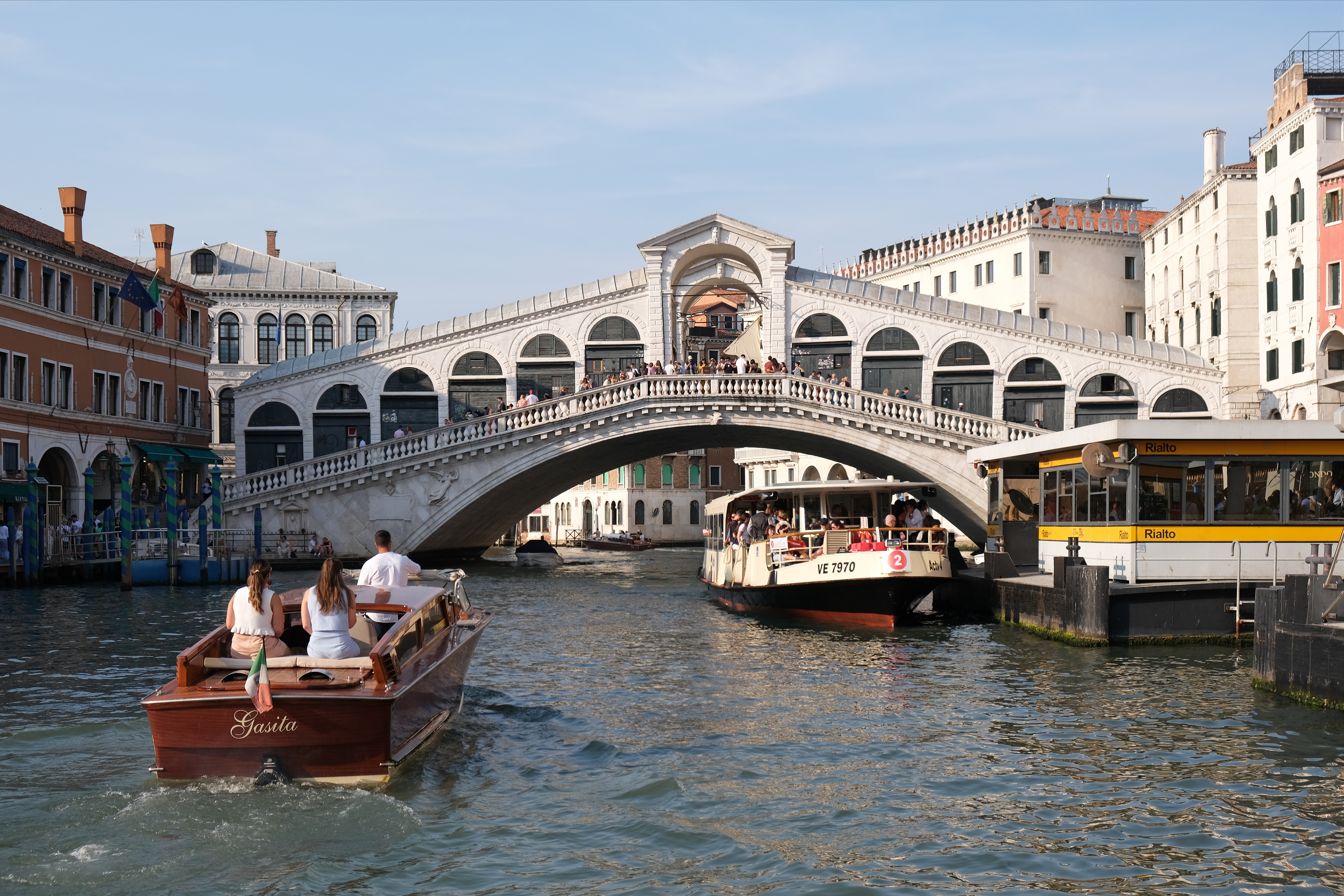
- Rialto Bridge crossing the Canal Grande
- Coordinates: 45.4380°N 12.3360°E
- Carries: pedestrian bridge
- Crosses: Grand Canal
- Locale: Venice, Veneto, Italy

Characteristics
- Design: stone arch bridge
- Width: 22.90 metres (75.1 ft)
- Height: 7.32 metres (24.0 ft) (arch only)
- Longest span: 31.80 metres (104.3 ft)

History
- Construction start: 1588; 438 years ago
- Construction end: 1591; 435 years ago

Location
- Click the map for an interactive, fullscreen view

The Rialto Bridge (Italian: Ponte di Rialto; Venetian: Ponte de Rialto) is the oldest of the four bridges spanning the Grand Canal in Venice, Italy. Connecting the sestieri (districts) of San Marco and San Polo, it has been rebuilt several times since its first construction as a pontoon bridge in 1173, and is now a significant tourist attraction in the city.

The present stone bridge is a single span designed by Antonio da Ponte. Construction began in 1588 and was completed in 1591. It is similar to the wooden bridge it succeeded. Two ramps lead up to a central portico. On either side of the portico, the covered ramps carry rows of shops. The engineering of the bridge was considered so audacious that architect Vincenzo Scamozzi predicted future ruin. The bridge has defied its critics to become one of the architectural icons, and top tourist attractions, in Venice.

== History ==
The first dry crossing of the Grand Canal was a pontoon bridge built in 1181 by Nicolò Barattieri. It was called the Ponte della Moneta, presumably because of the mint that stood near its eastern entrance.

The development and importance of the Rialto market on the eastern bank increased traffic on the floating bridge, so it was replaced in 1255 by a wooden bridge. This structure had two ramps meeting at a movable central section, that could be raised to allow the passage of tall ships. The connection with the market eventually led to a change of name for the bridge. During the first half of the 15th century, two rows of shops were built along the sides of the bridge. The rents brought an income to the State Treasury, which helped maintain the bridge.

Maintenance was vital for the timber bridge. It was partly burnt in the revolt led by Bajamonte Tiepolo in 1310. In 1444, it collapsed under the weight of a crowd rushing to see the marriage of the Marquis of Ferrara and it collapsed again in 1524.

The idea of rebuilding the bridge in stone was first proposed in 1503. Several projects were considered over the following decades. In 1551, the authorities requested proposals for the renewal of the Rialto Bridge, among other things. Plans were offered by famous architects, such as Jacopo Sansovino, Palladio and Vignola, but all involved a Classical approach with several arches, which was judged inappropriate to the situation. Michelangelo was also considered as designer of the bridge.

== Other names ==
It was called Shylock's bridge in Robert Browning's poem "A Toccata of Galuppi's". This is likely because Shylock references the bridge in Act I Scene III of The Merchant of Venice, speaking to Antonio (The Merchant of Venice): "Many a time and oft, In the Rialto you have rated me".

== Gallery ==
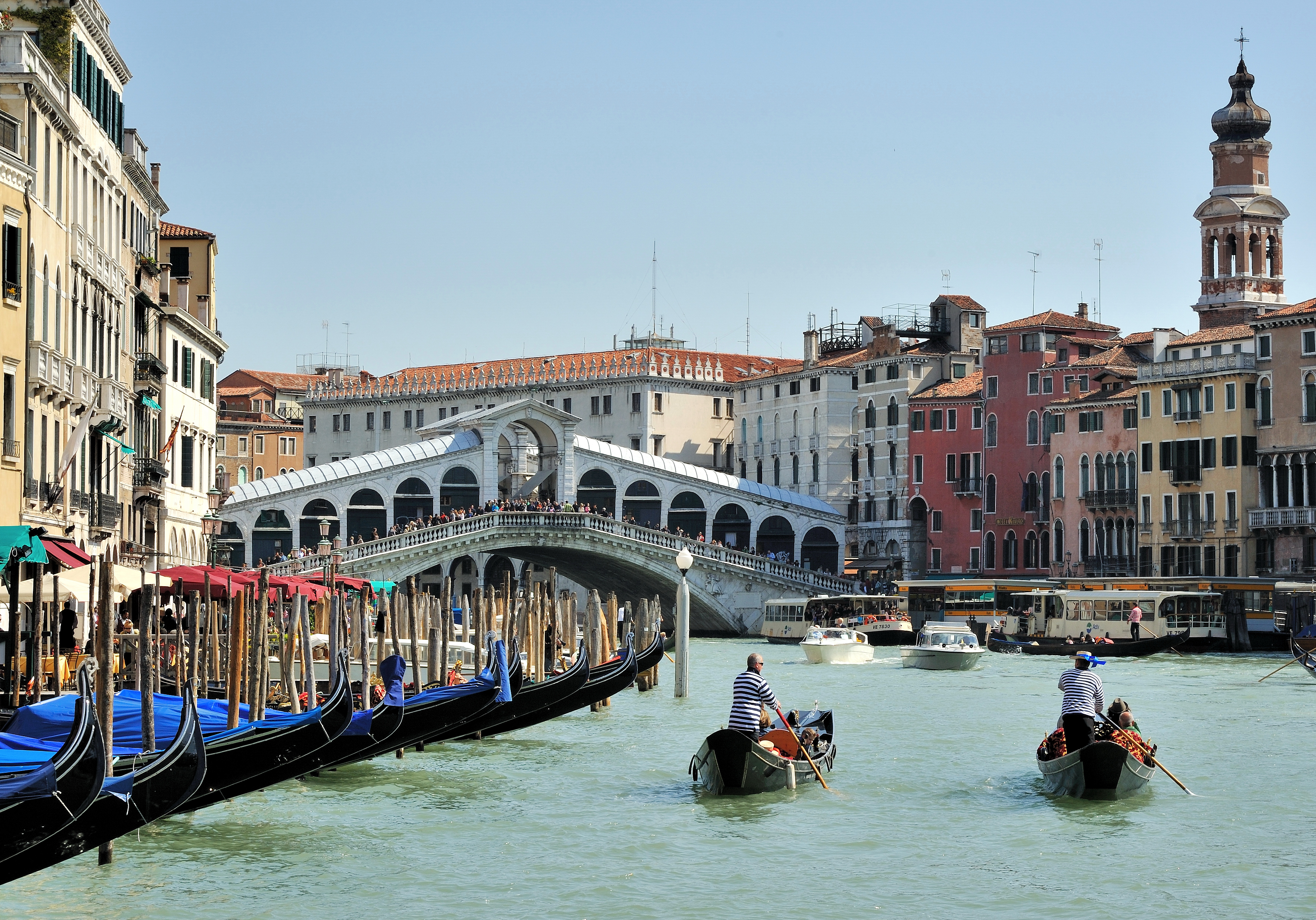
Gondoliers row past a row of gondolas on the Grand Canal near Rialto Bridge

Seen from a distance, at night

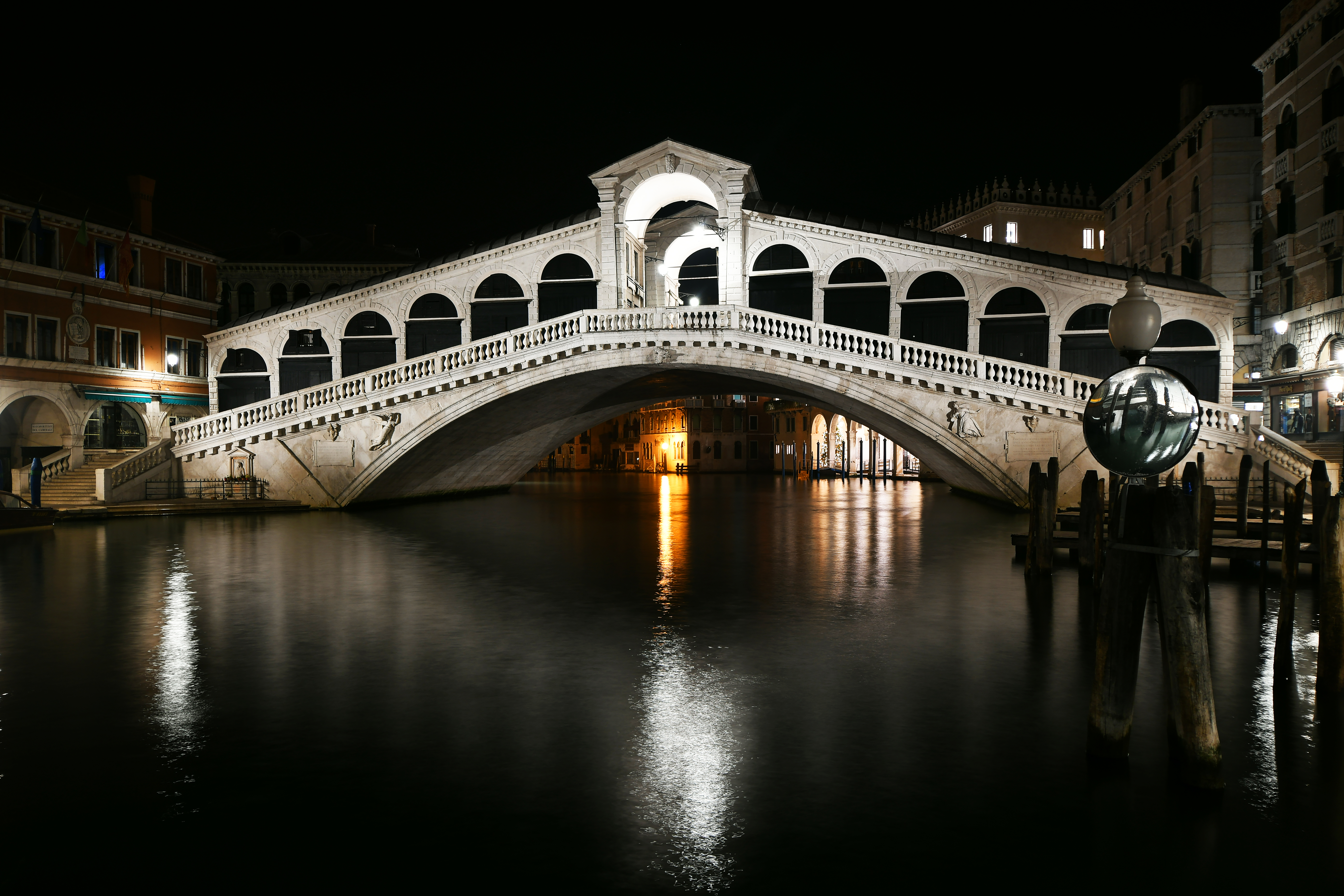
Night view

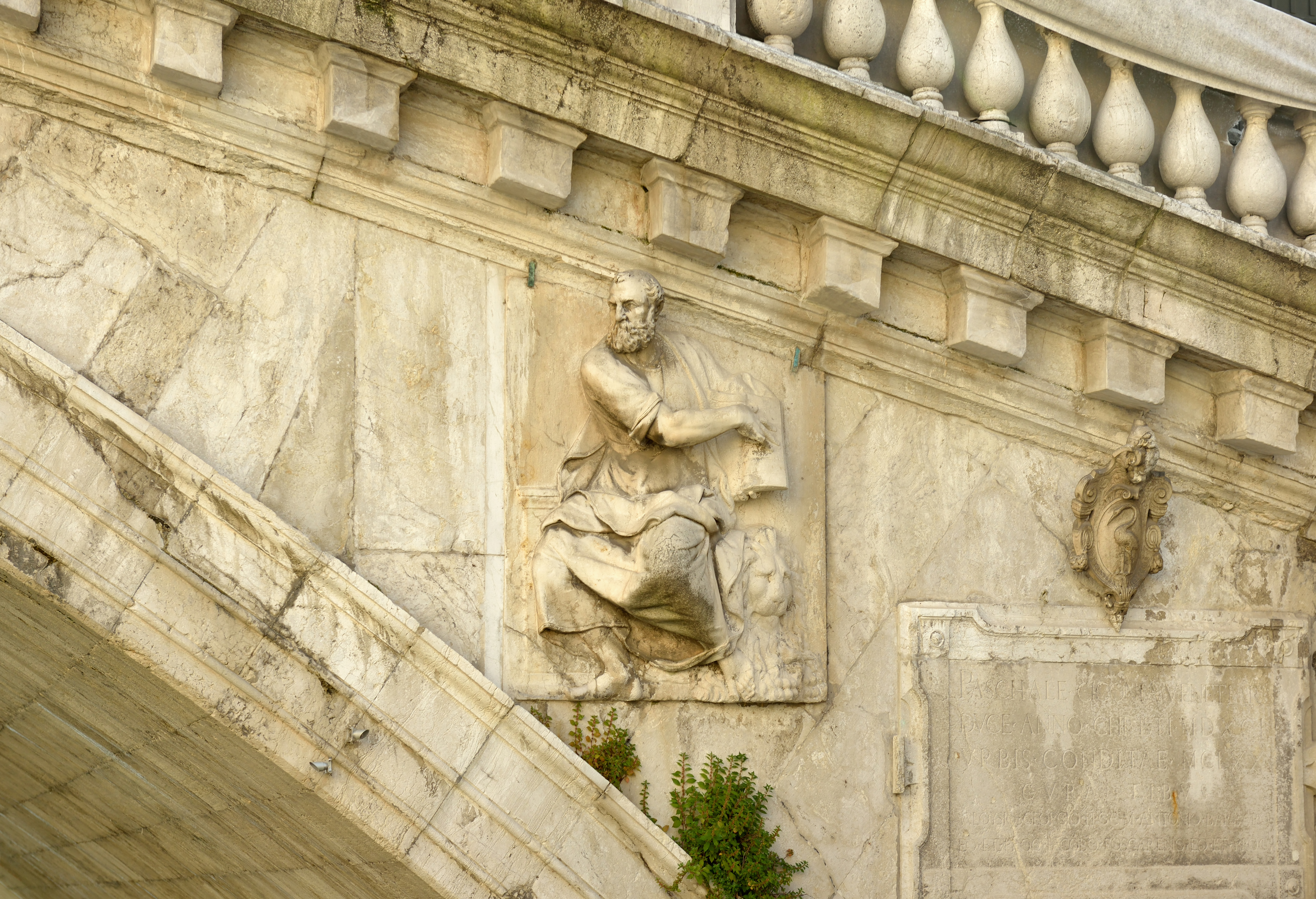
Detail of the relief of St. Mark on the bridge

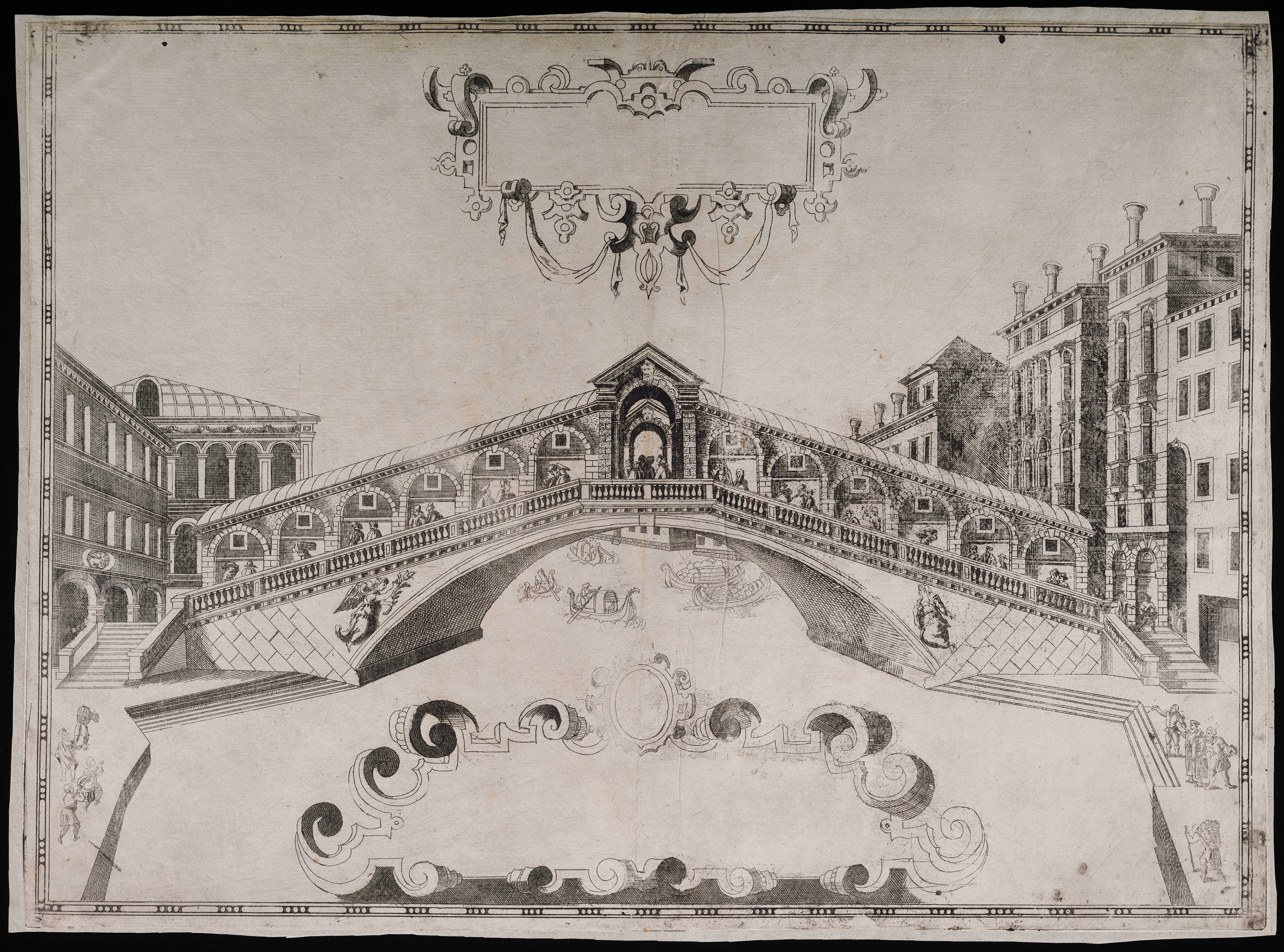
A view of the bridge from an untitled 16th century Italian print

== See also ==
- Miracle of the Relic of the Cross at the Ponte di Rialto (depiction of wooden bridge)
- List of buildings and structures in Venice
- Ponte Vecchio
- Krämerbrücke
- Pulteney Bridge
A comparison of the side elevation of the Rialto Bridge to the side elevations of some of the most notable bridges around the world on the same scale (see also interactive version)

Preceded by Il Redentore	Venice landmarks Rialto Bridge	Succeeded by San Giorgio Maggiore
