= Faliero coup =

Failed 1355 coup attempt in Venice

- Duration: April 14, 1355
- Location: Republic of Venice
- Type: Coup d'état
- Cause: Conflicts between Venetian nobles and Marino Faliero
- Organised by: Marino Faliero, Doge of Venice; Bertuccio Isarello; Filippo Calendario
- Outcome: Execution of Faliero and 9 other conspirators; Confirmation of Venice's stability as a republic

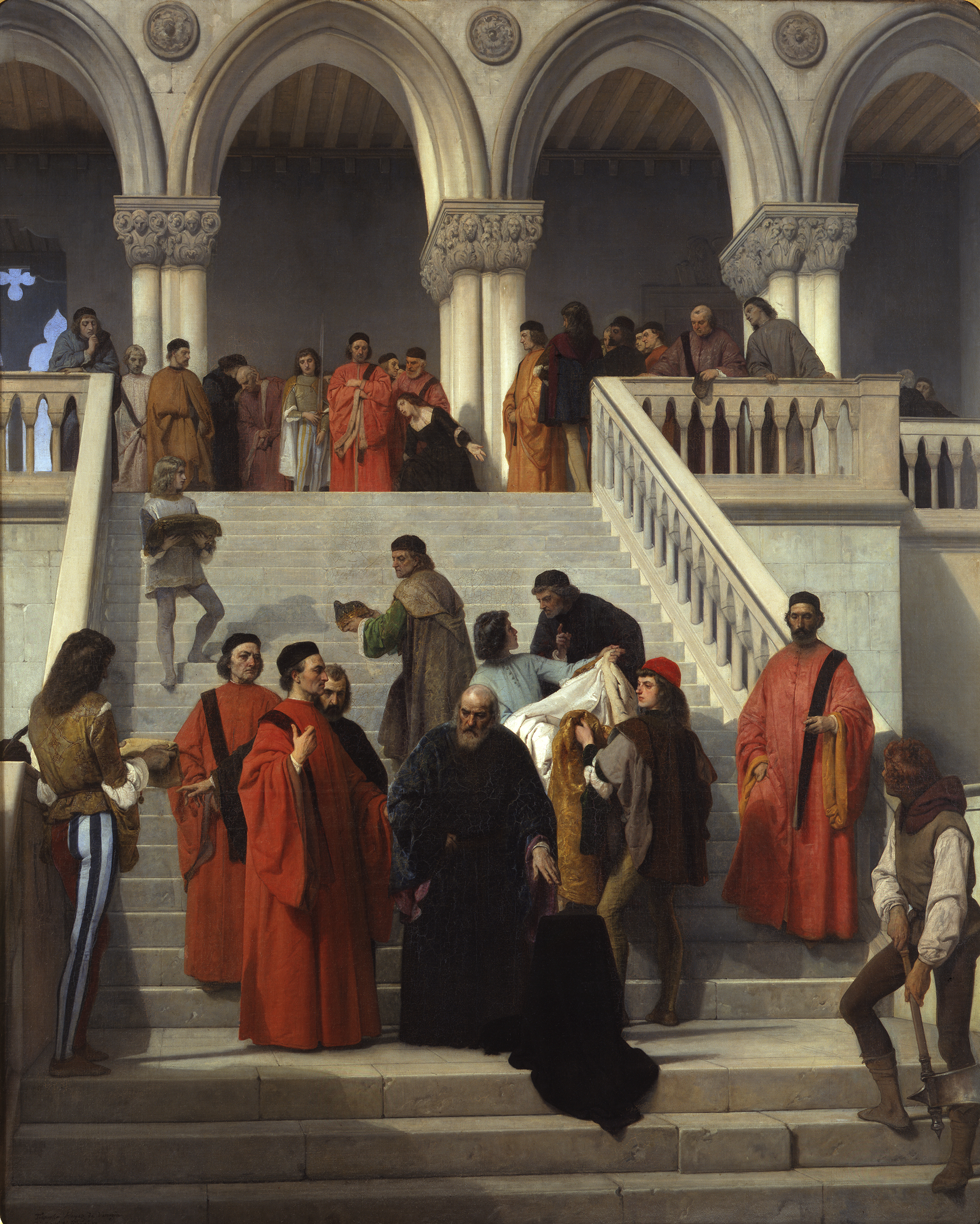
"The Final Moments of Doge Marin Faliero on the del Piombo Staircase" by Francesco Hayez

The Faliero coup was a failed 1355 coup designed to overthrow Venice's established republican government. Strains between the Venetian commoners and the nobility, originally stemming from the catastrophic failure of the nobility in the Battle of Porto-Longo against Venice's long-time rival, Genoa, are largely considered to be the main cause for the coup. However, traditional stories also point to the marriage of Doge Marino Faliero as a possible cause for the coup. Faliero, an 81-year-old man, had recently taken a young bride, who was rumored to be engaged in multiple affairs, including with Michele Steno, a Venetian statesman and future Doge. The consistent rumors and apparent intense arrogance of the established Venetian elite seems to have gotten to Faliero in this explanation for a coup. A more reasonable one, however, is that Faliero wished to transform Venice into an monarchy, mirroring those of Genoa and other northern Italian city-states.

Faliero conspired with two popular, wealthy, public figures who also had quarrels with the nobility: Bertuccio Isarello and Filippo Calendario. After convincing them of the need for a coup, he laid out his plan: Faliero and Isarello would recruit 20 trusted men who would assist in the overthrow of the government, who would each in turn recruit another 40.

However, due to the incredible variability of any given individuals' reaction to the plan, rumors of unrest quickly began to spread throughout the city and, the Venetian people, fearing the civil turmoil which was swelling up all around them in northern Italy and Byzantium, reported the rumors to the authorities. One of the most powerful governmental bodies of Republican Venice, the Council of Ten, soon convened to discuss the rumors. They became concerned about the Doge's role in the plot and, exercising emergency powers, together with the ducal councillors, the Signori di Notte, and the six sestieri, ordered the immediate and unquestioned arrest of Calendario and Isarello, who, upon questioning, implicated the Doge. After a series of quick albeit somber trials, the conspirators were imprisoned and executed, including Calendario, Isarello, and Doge Faliero.

== See also ==
- Tiepolo conspiracy
