= Pietro Gradenigo =

Doge of Venice from 1289 to 1311

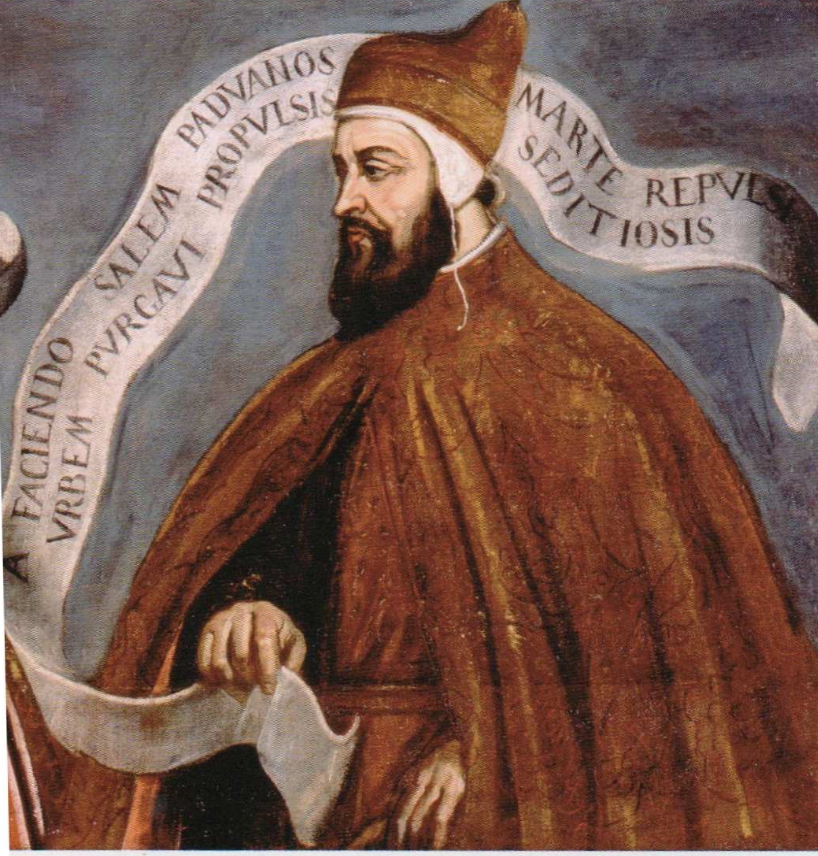
- Portrait in the Doge’s Palace

Doge of Venice
- In office 1289–1311
- Preceded by: Giovanni Dandolo
- Succeeded by: Marino Zorzi

Personal details
- Born: 1251
- Died: 13 August 1311 (aged 59–60)

Pietro Gradenigo (1251 – 13 August 1311) was the 49th Doge of Venice, reigning from 1289 until his death.

== Conflicts with the Mamluks, Genoa, and the Byzantine Empire ==
When he was elected Doge, he was serving as the podestà of Capodistria in Istria. Venice suffered a serious blow with the Fall of Acre, the last Crusader stronghold in the mainland, to the Mamluks of Egypt in 1291. The war between Venice and Genoa began in 1294, and Venice sustained some serious losses: it lost a naval battle; its possessions in Crete were pillaged; and the Byzantine emperor, Andronikos II Palaiologos, arrested many Venetians in Constantinople. In response, the Venetian fleet sacked Galata and threatened the imperial palace of Blachernae, but in 1298 they lost again - this time at Curzola. Eventually, in 1299 the two republics signed a peace treaty.

== Restricting the membership of the Great Council ==
Doge Gradenigo was responsible for the so-called Serrata del Maggior Consiglio, the "locking" or "closing" of the Great Council of Venice. This new law, passed in February 1297, restricted membership of the future Councils only to the descendants of those nobles who were its members between 1293 and 1297. This move created an oligarchic system, disenfranchising a great majority of the citizens and provoking some unrest.

== Conflict with the Papal States and failed coup ==
In 1308, during Gradenigo's reign as doge, Venice became involved in war with the Papacy over the control of Ferrara and on 27 March 1309 the Republic was excommunicated by Pope Clement V, barring all Christians from trading with Venice. The Doge's policy, seen by many as disastrous, led to a plot to depose him and the Great Council, led by Bajamonte Tiepolo and other members of the aristocratic families. On 15 June 1310, the coup failed and its leaders were severely punished. Tiepolo's plot led to the creation of the Council of Ten, initially as a temporary institution, which later evolved into the permanent body which in reality governed the Republic.

== Death and burial ==
On 13 August 1311, Gradenigo died, and, since Venice was under interdict and the religious ceremonies could not be held, he was buried in an unmarked grave on Murano.

== Marriages and granddaughter ==
He was married first to Tomasina Morosini (with whom he had a daughter, Anna, wife of Jacopo I da Carrara) and then to Agnese Zantani. His granddaughter, Alvica Gradenigo, was later dogaressa.

Political offices
Preceded by Giovanni Dandolo	Doge of Venice; 1289–1311	Succeeded by Marino Zorzi
