= Castel Tedaldo =

Former medieval castle forming part of the defenses of Ferrara

Coordinates: 44.83885501°N 11.60690986°E

Castel Tealdo or Thealto was a former medieval castle forming part of the defenses of Ferrara. Few traces of its existence remain.

The castle stood along the river, west of the town, as did the Castel Novo, and was built in the 10th century by Tealdo da Canossa, Count of Modena and son of Otto I, Holy Roman Emperor. In 1317, the city rebelled against the rule of Robert, King of Naples, and locals overpowered the Catalan mercenaries who had taken shelter in the castle. This led to the admission of the Este to Ferrara. The castle was then rebuilt by Alberto d'Este in 1395.

In 1597–1608, this castle and the churches of San Giovanni Battista and Sant'Agata were razed to build a papal fortress. The Castel Nuovo was razed in 1562. The papal fortress was razed in the 19th century.
