= Lords of the Night (Venice) =

Scene from the 1840 opera Marino Faliero in which the Signori della Notte help to track down the conspirators.

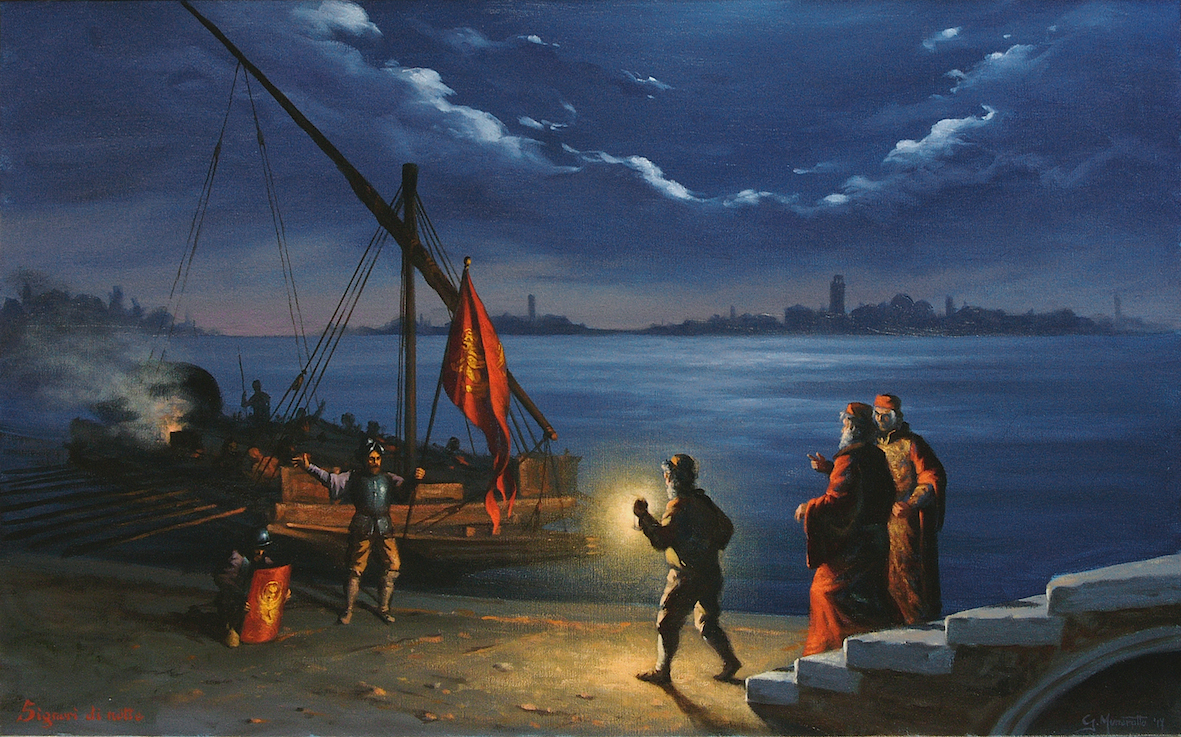
The "Lords of the Night" during their nocturnal investigative activity. Gianfranco Munerotto, Signori di Notte, Venice, 2017

The Lords of the Night (Italian: Signori della/di Notte) were magistrates in the Republic of Venice that operated in special courts.

== The Criminal Lords of the Night ==
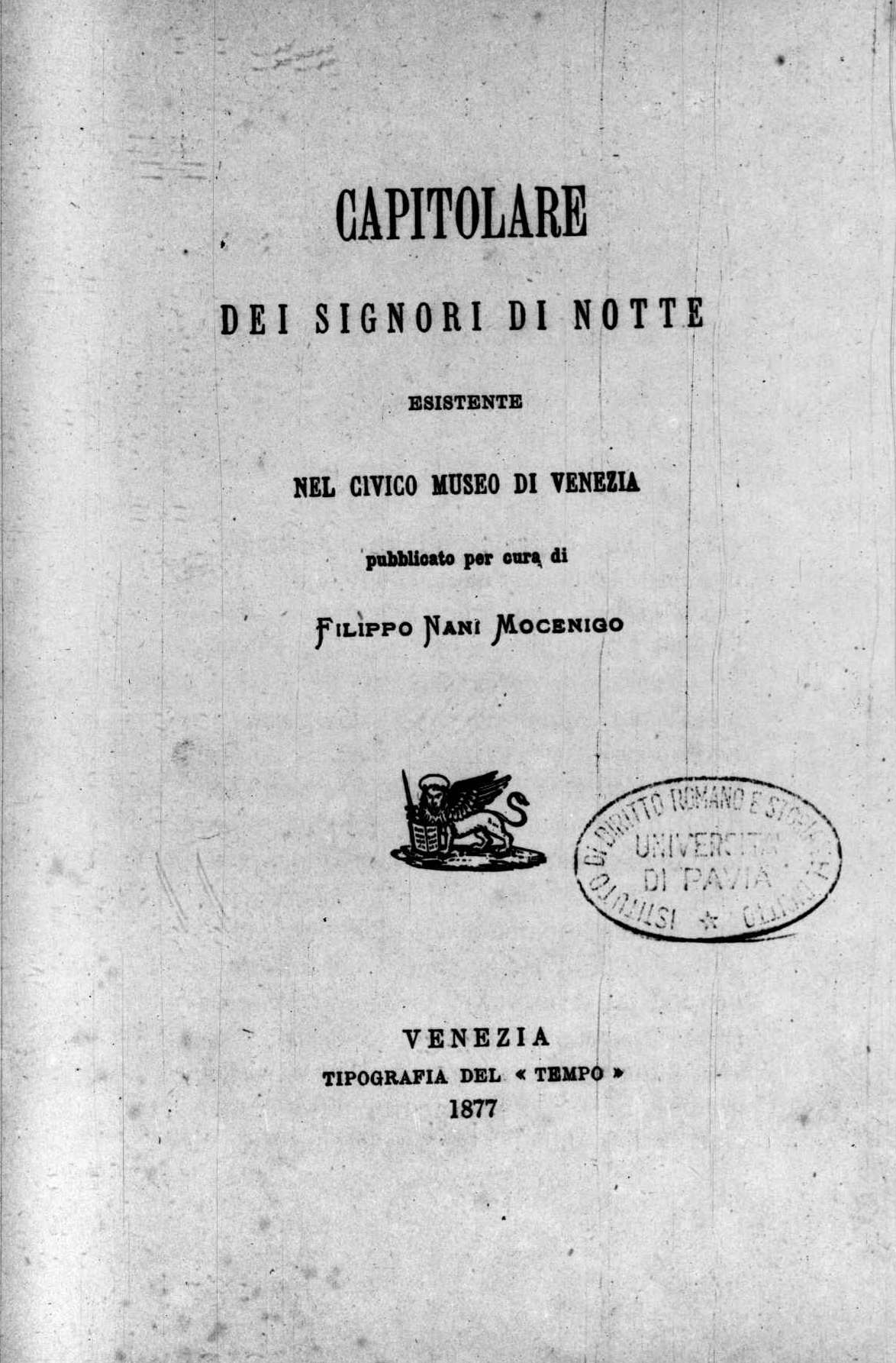
Filippo Nani Mocenigo, Capitolare dei signori di notte, 1877

The Criminal Lords of the Night are mentioned as early as the 12th century, first as two, and later as six nobles, with one for each district (sestiere) of Venice since 1260. Their name is derived from the initial responsibility of monitoring what was happening throughout the city during the night. Their areas of prosecuting included theft, murder, bigamy, carnal crimes of slaves, firearms, assaults, criminal conspiracy, homelessness, rape, desertion from galleys and non-payment of rents. They gathered in a dining room of the Doge's Palace in the Chamber of Torment, with interrogations and trials taking place usually at night or dusk. This enabled them, among other things, to apply the rope torture, and for the judges to present themselves to the defendant turning their shoulders to a wide window that partially concealed their appearance. Defendants could appeal their ruling by the Criminal Council of Forty through the Avogadori de Comùn.

== Civil Lords of the Night ==
By the end of 1544, the Civil Lords of the Night (Signori della Notte al Civìl) were created with part of their duties transferred from the criminal system, including enforcement of foreign sentences, sales of pledges, exile of criminals and the unwanted. They acted as a substitute for courts that did not operate on public holidays.
