= Bajamonte Tiepolo =

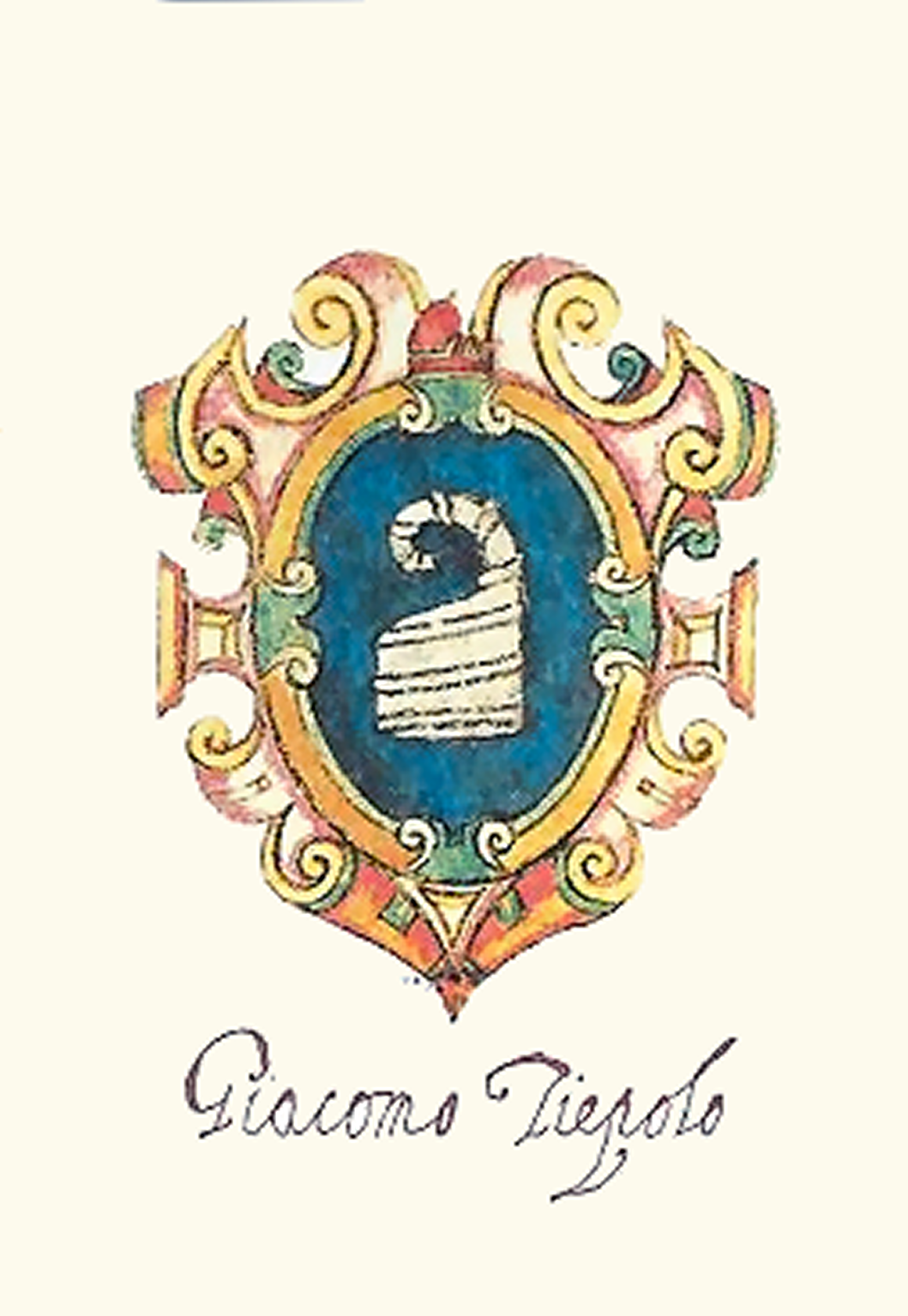
Coat of arms of Jacopo Tiepolo

Bajamonte Tiepolo (died after 1329) was a Venetian noble, great-grandson of Doge Jacopo Tiepolo, grandson of Doge Lorenzo Tiepolo, son of Giacomo Tiepolo. Bajamonte's wife was the Princess of Rascia. Marco Querini, a fellow conspirator, was his father-in-law.

== Biography ==
=== Conspiracy against the doge ===
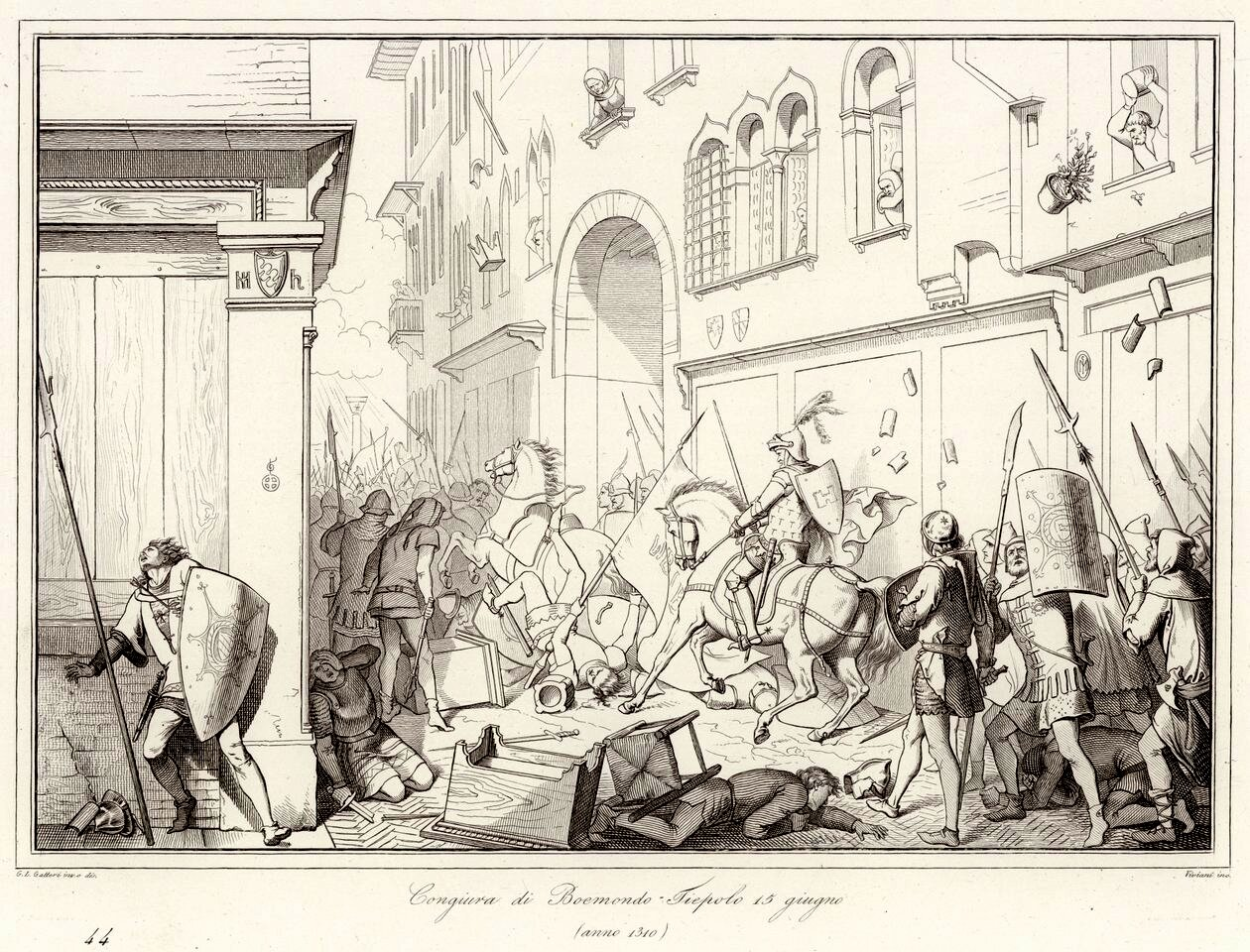
Street fighting during Tiepolo's attempted coup, by Giuseppe Lorenzo Gatteri

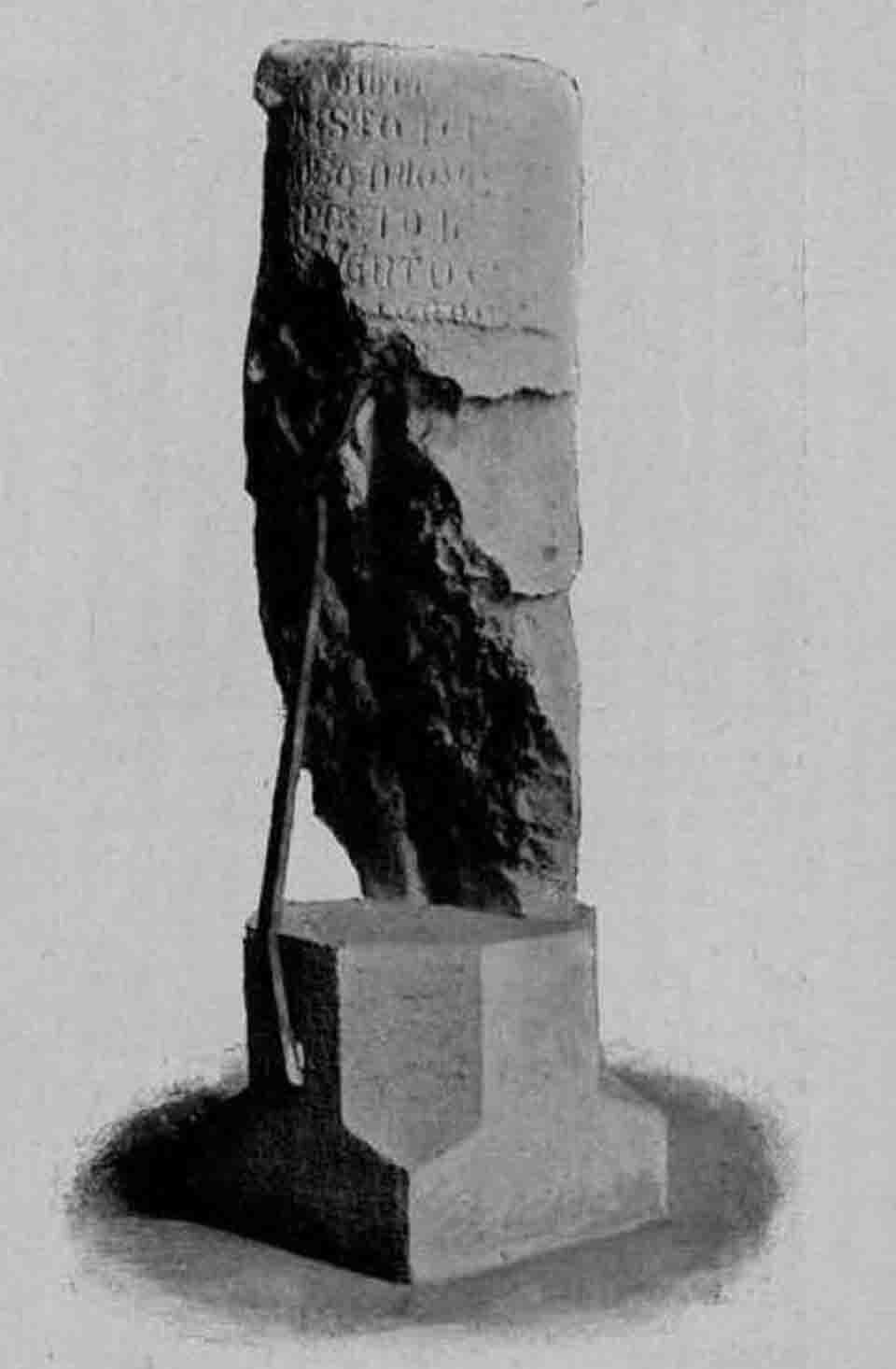
Colomon of infamy Bajamonte Tiepolo

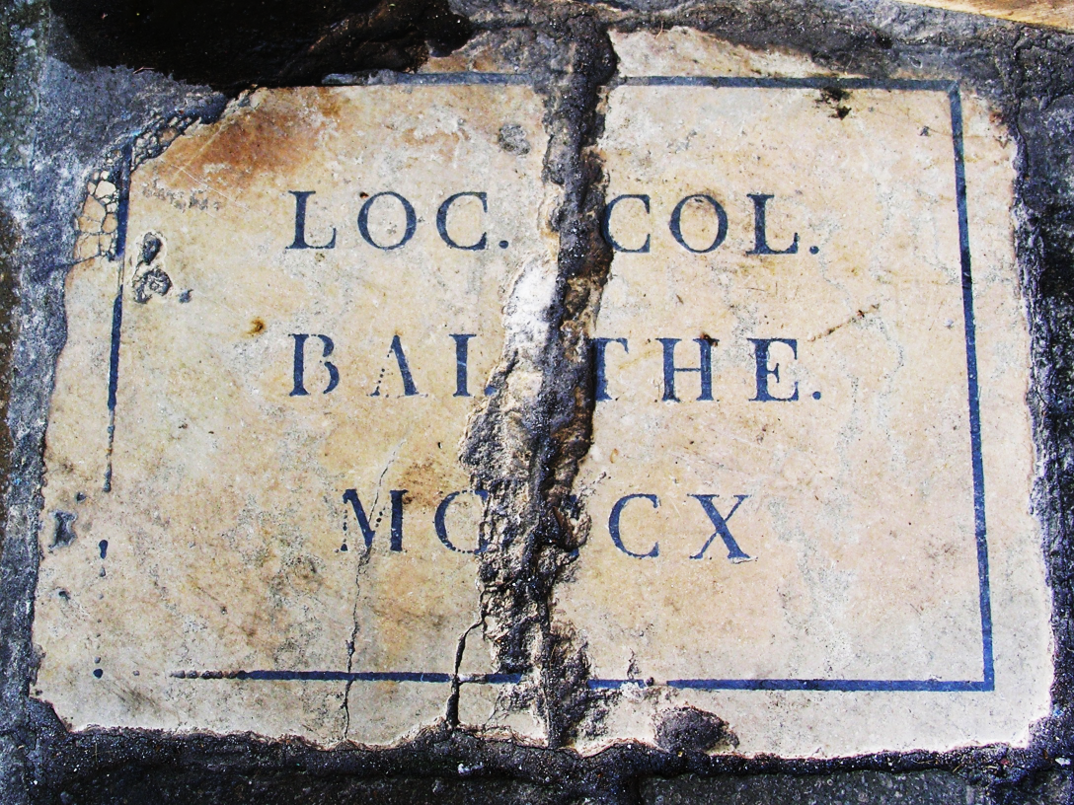
The marker that replaced the Colomon of infamy Bajamonte Tiepolo

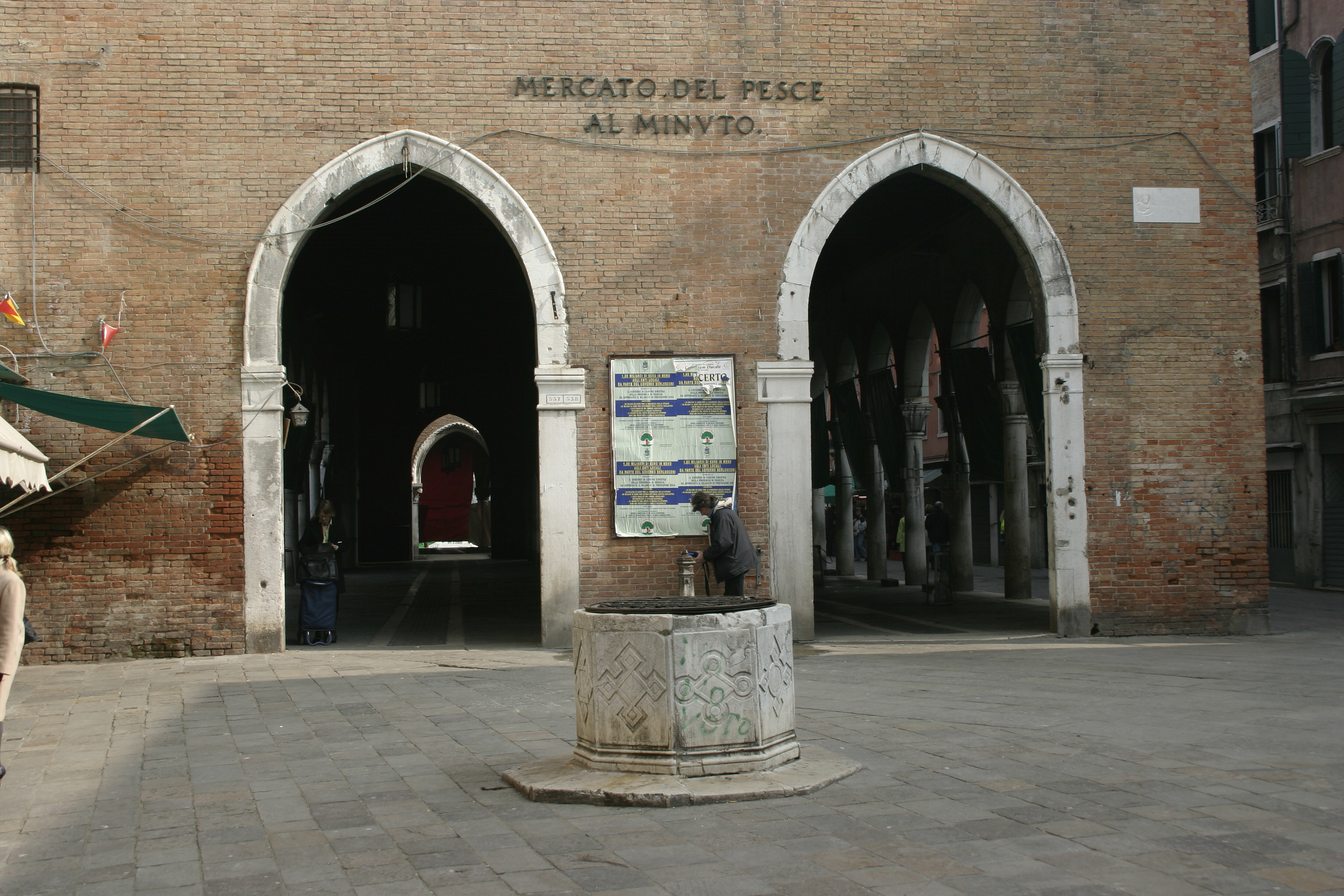
The arches of the Fish Market facing Campo delle Beccarie are said to have come from the Querini palace, demolished after their participation in the conspiracy.

Unhappy with the policies of the reigning Doge, Pietro Gradenigo, Tiepolo and other members of the leading families of the old aristocracy, the Querini (Marco and Piero) and the Badoer (former Partecipazio), organized a conspiracy, put into effect on 15 June 1310, the Feast of Saint Vitus, to overthrow the Doge and the Great Council of Venice. Their plot failed due to treachery, bad planning, insufficient popular support and stormy weather. The rebels were stopped near Piazza San Marco by the forces faithful to Doge and defeated. According to a popular but historically unconfirmed tale, Tiepolo himself fled from the fight when his standard-bearer was killed by a stone mortar thrown down from a window by the elder woman named Giustina or Lucia Rossi. During their retreat to the San Polo sestiere, the Rialto Bridge was burnt down.

Eventually, Tiepolo surrendered and was then sentenced to exile in Istria, condemned to damnatio memoriae and his house was demolished, as was a house belonging to the Querini brothers. After Tiepolo's house was demolished, a column of infamy was erected in Sant'Agostin bearing these words: "Haec terra ad Bajamontem pertinebat, et nunc propter iniquam proditionem, hoc positum est ut alios terreret, et verba haec omnibus in perpetuum ostenderet."

"This land belonged to Bajamonte and now for his iniquitous betrayal, this has been placed to frighten others, and to show these words to everyone forever."

=== Banishment ===
Even from exile, Bajamonte Tiepolo sent a henchman to destroy the column. The man called Francesco Fontebon, succeeded in breaking it into three pieces before he was caught in the act. He was deprived of a hand and his eyes were put out. The column was repaired and re-erected behind the nearby church of Sant'Agostin. Four hundred years later, in 1785, one Angelo Maria Querini purchased the column, leaving in its place a humble stone plaque that read: "Loc. Col. Bai. The. MCCCX.", which means "Location of column of Bajamonte Tiepolo 1310". The column now lies in the stores of the Fondazione Musei Civici di Venezia.

Later, Tiepolo was permanently banished for allegedly contacting the enemies of the Republic and he is unheard of after 1329, most likely dying in Croatia. Shortly after his banishment, he is recorded to have served as the potestat of the city of Nin in 1311, 1320 and 1322. He participated in a battle against Ivan Nelipić on the side of his relative George II Šubić of Bribir in 1324 near Knin, during which they were defeated and imprisoned.

== Legacy ==
The plot against the Doge led to the creation of the Council of Ten, initially as a temporary institution, but later evolved into a permanent body with the special task of preventing conspiracies and attempted coups. Its power eventually grew to make it one of the most important elements in the Venetian government.
