= Badoer =

Venetian noble family

Coat of arms of Badoer family

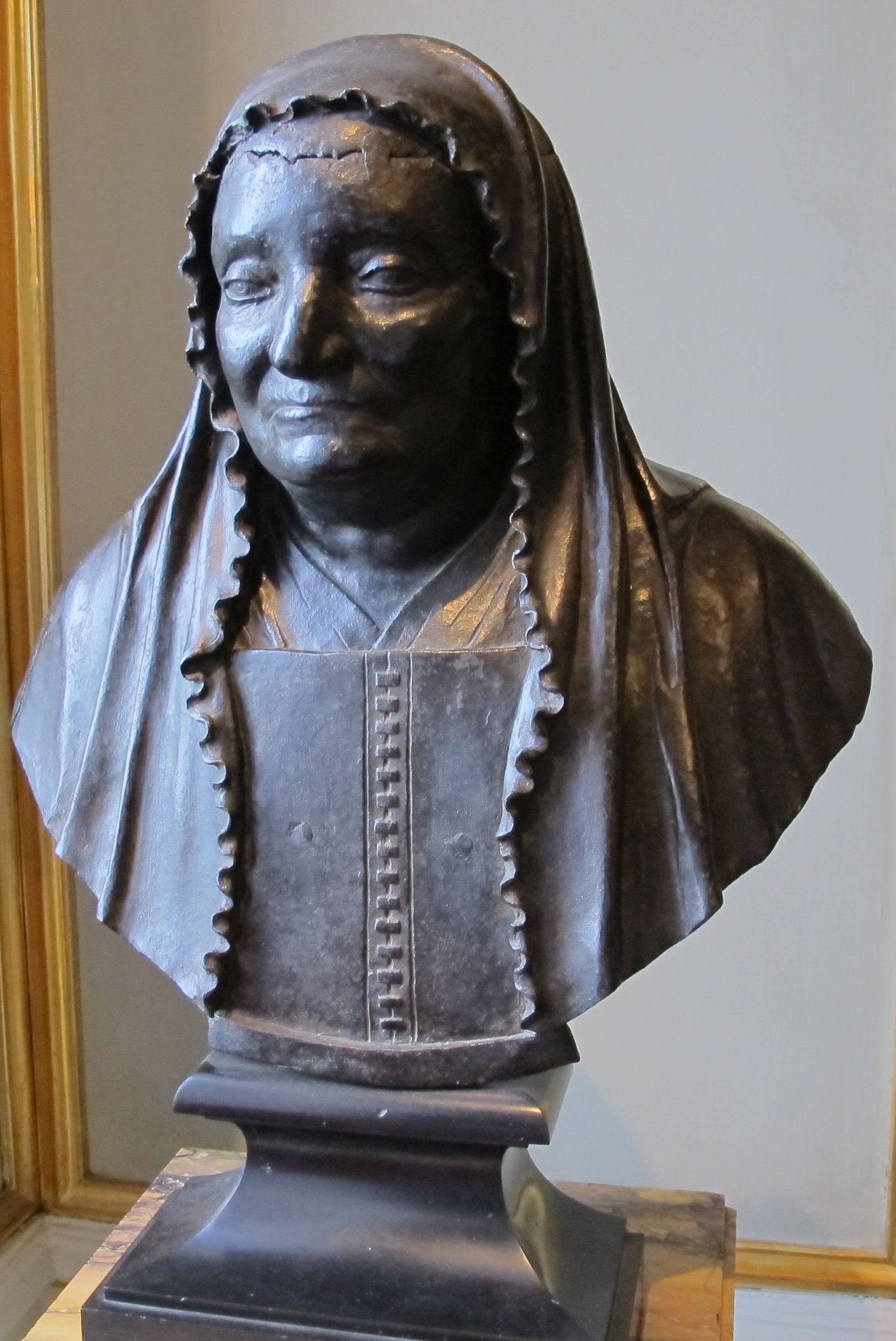
Bust of Agnesina Badoer (16th century)

The Badoer (Venetian: [badoˈɛɾ], Italian: [badoˈɛr]) were an aristocratic family in the Republic of Venice. The Badoer traced their ancestry, without any factual basis, to Doge Giustiniano Participazio in the early 9th century. In fact, they rose to prominence in the 13th century.

== Notable members ==
- Stefano Badoer (fl. 1227–1242)
- Marco Badoer (d. 1288)
- Badoero Badoer (d. 1310), podestà of Padua implicated in the Querini–Tiepolo conspiracy
- Marino Badoer (d. 1324)
- Marino Badoer, duke of Crete in 1313–1315, dedicatee of Paolino Veneto's mirror for princes
- Donata Badoer (fl. 1280–1333), wife of Marco Polo
- Pietro Badoer (d. 1371)
- Bonaventura Badoer Peraga (1332–1389), theologian and cardinal
- Albano Badoer (d. 1428)
- Giacomo Badoer (b. 1403), author of the Libro dei conti
- Iacopino Badoer (d. 1451)
- Sebastiano Badoer (1425/7–1498), ambassador in Hungary
- Andrea Badoer (1447–1525), ambassador to Henry VIII of England
- Giacomo Badoer (d. 1537)
- Giovanni Badoer (1465–1535), politician, diplomat and poet
- Alvise Badoer (d. 1554), provveditore generale of Dalmatia and ambassador to Emperor Charles V
- Francesco Badoer (1507–1564)
- Francesco Badoer (1512–1572), built the Villa Badoer
- Andrea Biagio Badoer (1515–1575)
- Federico Badoer (1519–1593), writer, diplomat and politician
- Alberto Badoer (1540–1592)
- Angelo Badoer (1565–1630), politician, diplomat and spy in the service of the Papal State and Spanish Empire
- Francesco Badoer (1570–1610)
- Giacomo Badoer (c.1575–c.1620), French diplomat and pupil of Galileo Galilei
- Marino Badoer (d. 1648), bishop of Pula
- Iacopo Badoer (1602–1654), politician and writer
- Barbaro Giacomo Badoer (1617–1657)
- Alberto Badoer (d. 1677), bishop of Crema
- Giovanni Alberto Badoer (1649–1714), cardinal and patriarch of Venice

== Bibliography ==
- Bosmin, Pietro (1930). "Badoer". Enciclopedia Italiana. Vol. 5: Assi–Bals. Rome: Istituto della Enciclopedia Italiana.
- Pozza, Marco (1982). I Badoer: Una famiglia veneziana dal X al XIII secolo. Abano Terme: Francisci Editore.
- Romano, Dennis (2019). Patricians and Popolani: The Social Foundations of the Venetian Renaissance State. Johns Hopkins University Press.
