= Coxhead =

Coxhead is a surname. Notable people with the surname include:

- Craig Coxhead, New Zealand judge
- Elizabeth Coxhead (1909–1979), English writer and mountaineer
- Ernest Coxhead (1863–1933), English architect
- Maurice Coxhead (1889–1917), English cricketer
- Michael Coxhead, British businessman
