= Sebastiano Badoer =

Venetian patrician, diplomat and humanist (c. 1427–1498)

Sebastiano Badoer (c. 1427–1498) was a Venetian patrician, diplomat and humanist. He served as ambassador four times to the Holy See, thrice to Milan and once each to Naples, Hungary, France and the Empire. He left behind few writings but ample testimonies of his learning.

== Life ==
Sebastiano was the eldest son of the merchant Giacomo Badoer and Maria Grimani. He was born between 1425 and 1427. Sebastiano studied under Paolo della Pergola at the Scuola di Rialto. He was brought before the Avogadoria de Comun for his prove di nobiltà (confirmation of nobility), which usually took place around the age of eighteen, on 3 September 1445. In 1448, he married Cattaruzza Zustignan. They had one son, Giacomo, who fought the Ottoman Turks on the Isonzo in 1477.

In 1451, he was elected to the Council of Forty. In 1457, he was a savio agli ordini and ambassador to the Kingdom of Naples. In 1469, he was one of two savi responsible for handling the estate of the late Bertoldo d'Este. Between 1457 and 1469, he may have been engaged in commerce.

His political career picked up in the 1470s. In 1474–1476, Sebastiano was the ambassador to the Kingdom of Hungary. His goal was to procure Hungarian assistance in the defence of Scutari against the Ottoman Turks. He was knighted by King Matthias of Hungary. He is usually qualified in documents thereafter as a knight. In 1477, he was podestà of Bergamo and in 1478 of Verona. In 1479, he was named ambassador to the Holy See. He was recalled at the first sounds of a papally-sponsored anti-Venetian league.

Around 1480, he was captain of Brescia. In 1481–1482, he was on the Avogadoria de Comun. He played a major role in the War of Ferrara in 1482–1484. In 1482, he was the ambassador to the Holy See again. In 1482–1483, he was a savio di Terraferma. He negotiated with the 'condottiero Roberto Sanseverino at Padua in 1482 and was provveditore of Polesine in 1483. After Venice was placed under interdict by Pope Sixtus IV, Sebastiano was sent to Frederick II, Holy Roman Emperor, to defend the republic's actions. He was appointed on 22 July 1483 and remained at Frederick's court until April 1484. He was not successful in gaining imperial support. In 1484, he was sent as ambassador to France.

Sebastiano served a second stint as podestà of Verona, finishing the late Francesco Diedo's term in 1484. He was named ambassador to the Duchy of Milan in 1485–1486. In 1486, he was on the Minor Council. He arrived in Rome for a third time as ambassador to the Holy See in November 1486. In 1487, he was a second time ambassador at Milan before returning to Rome in 1487–1488. He was ambassador when Bernardo Bembo came to Rome in 1487. In 1489, he joined the Minor Council again. In 1490, he served as captain of Padua. In 1492, 1496 and 1498, he was a savio grande. In 1492, he undertook a fourth embassy to Rome. He was on the Minor Council again in 1493, 1494 and 1497. He led a third embassy to Milan in 1494–1495.

Sebastiano died on 30 June 1498.

== Works ==
A volume of his orations and epistles was printed in 1477, but is now thought to be lost. Only two of his Latin orations are preserved. His Oratio ad Sixtum IV, Responsio ad pontificis responsionem was delivered to Sixtus IV in 1482 after an apparently hostile reception. His Oratio ad Alexandrum VI Pontificem Maximum in prestanda Venetorum obedientia was delivered before Pope Alexander VI on 17 December 1492. The oration delivered by Bernardo Bembo before Pope Innocent VIII on 24 November 1487 was also in the name of Badoer, but was the work of Bembo.

Some of Sebastiano's letters survive alongside those of Benedetto Trevisan in a collection from the period of his final Milanese embassy (1494–1495). The collection is entitled Registrum litterarum magnificorum dominorum Sebastiani Baduario equitis et Benedicti Trivisano oratorum ad illustrissimum dominum ducem Mediolani ('register of letters of the magnificent lords Sebastiano Badoer, knight, and Benedetto Trevisan, orators to the most illustrious lord duke of Milan'). Letters to Sebastiano survive from Giovanni Michele Alberto da Carrara, Bernardino Gadolo, Marsilio Ficino and Marcantonio Sabellico.

Despite these meagre survivals, Sebastiano's reputation as a humanist by the numerous references to his learning in contemporaries' writings. He was praised for his learning by Francesco Negri and Francesco Pisani and was a member of the literary circle around Filippo Buonaccorsi. In 1482, Nicoletto Vernia dedicated to Badoer his edition of Walter Burley's commentary on Aristotle's Physics. In 1496, Alessandro Benedetti dedicated his Diario de bello carolo to Sebastiano Badoer and Bernardo Contarini. Antonio Cittadini dedicated to Badoer his work on Averroes and Giorgio Valla his edition of Eusebius of Caesarea. In 1503, Agostino Nifo dedicated his De intellectu to a certain Sebastiano Badoer, but this could not have been the same Sebastiano.

== Bibliography ==
- Cracco, Giorgio (1963). "Badoer, Sebastiano". Dizionario Biografico degli Italiani (in Italian). Vol. 5: Bacca–Baratta. Rome: Istituto dell'Enciclopedia Italiana. pp. 142–126. OCLC 883370.
- Dean, Trevor (1988). Land and Power in Late Medieval Ferrara: The Rule of the Este, 1350–1450. Cambridge University Press.
- King, Margaret L. (2014) [1985]. Venetian Humanism in an Age of Patrician Dominance. Princeton University Press.
- Varanini, Gian Maria, ed. (2014). Marino Sanudo: Itinerario per la Terraferma veneziana. Viella.
