= Mechanics (Aristotle) =

Mathematical work attributed to Aristotle

Mechanics (Greek: Μηχανικά; Latin: Mechanica), also called Mechanical Problems or Questions of Mechanics, is a text traditionally attributed to Aristotle, but generally regarded as spurious (cf. Pseudo-Aristotle). Thomas Winter has suggested that the author was Archytas, while Michael Coxhead says that it is only possible to conclude that the author was one of the Peripatetics.

During the Renaissance, an edition of this work was published by Francesco Maurolico. A Latin translation was made by Vettor Fausto, dedicated to Giovanni Badoer in 1517.

== See also ==
- Aristotle's wheel paradox
