= Castello di Roncade =

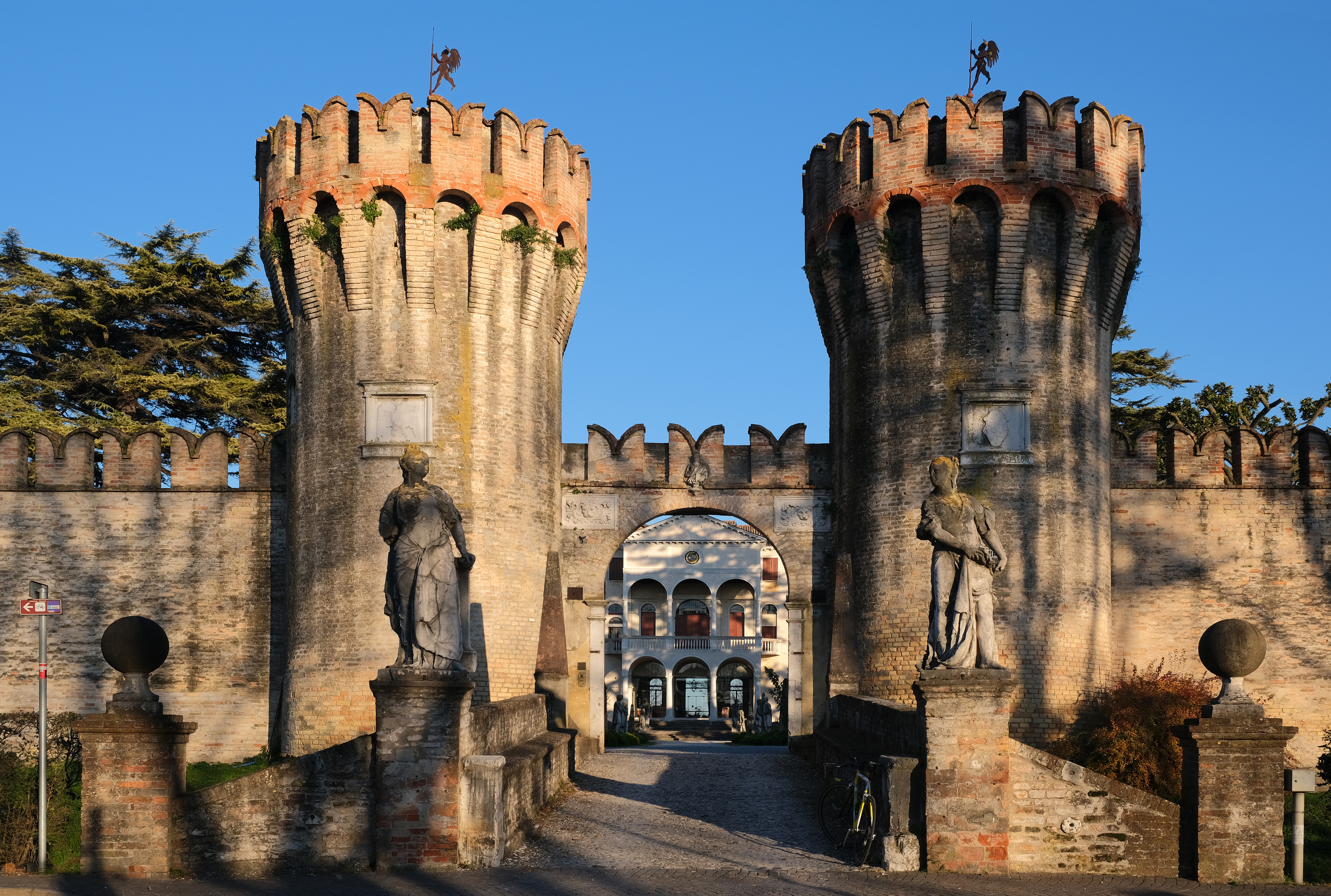
The main entrance

The Villa Giustinian, Ciani Bassetti, known as Castello di Roncade, is a Venetian villa in Roncade, near Treviso. The villa is surrounded by turreted walls in imitation of a medieval fortress, with the villa within.

== History ==
The property belonged to the Badoer family in the 15th century, who owned several mills in Musestre. In 1495 Girolamo Badoer left the estate to his daughter Agnesina, who married Benedetto Badoer. Widowed, Agnesina married Girolamo Giustinian. Agnesina and her second husband built a villa, which was underway in 1514, and completed by 1529. The villa remained in the Giustinian family until 1915, when it was purchased by the Ciani Bassetti family.

During World War II the fortified villa was used as a German command post, and was a target for aerial bombardment which damaged the walls and turrets.

== Description ==
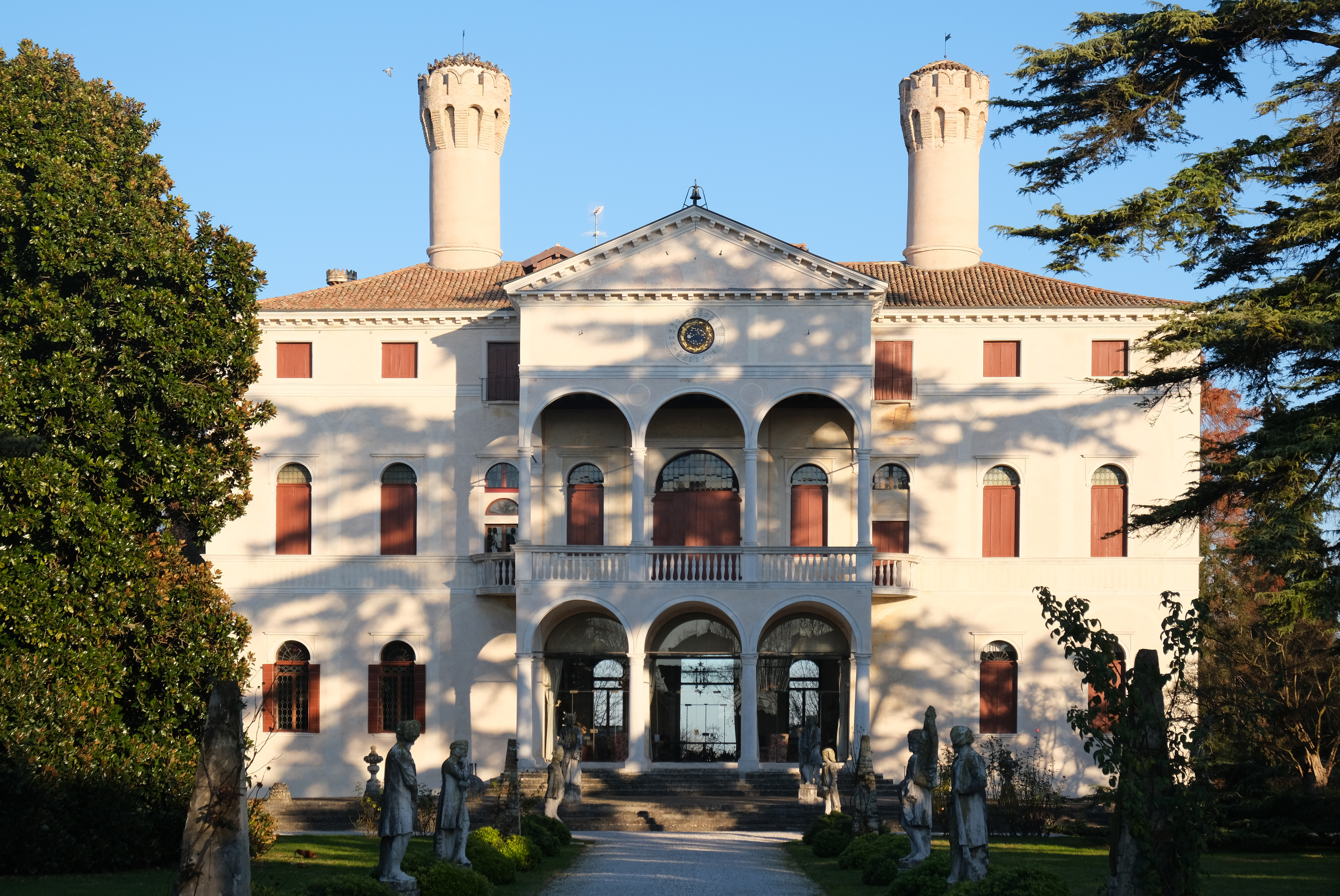
The villa

The rectangular complex is surrounded by moated walls. The villa stands within, flanked by extensions that served an agricultural purpose. The western wall features the main entrance, flanked by prominent turrets.

In contrast to the fortress-like exterior, the villa is a simple rectangular block with a two-story pedimented arcade on slender columns. The side bays are two and a half stories high, with arched windows in the first and second levels, and small square windows in the attic story, with a hipped roof. The prominent chimneys are proportioned and detailed to echo the entrance turrets.

The interior is organized around a center hall on the two main levels. Interior ceilings are of beamed wood construction.
