= Francesco Badoer (1512–1572) =

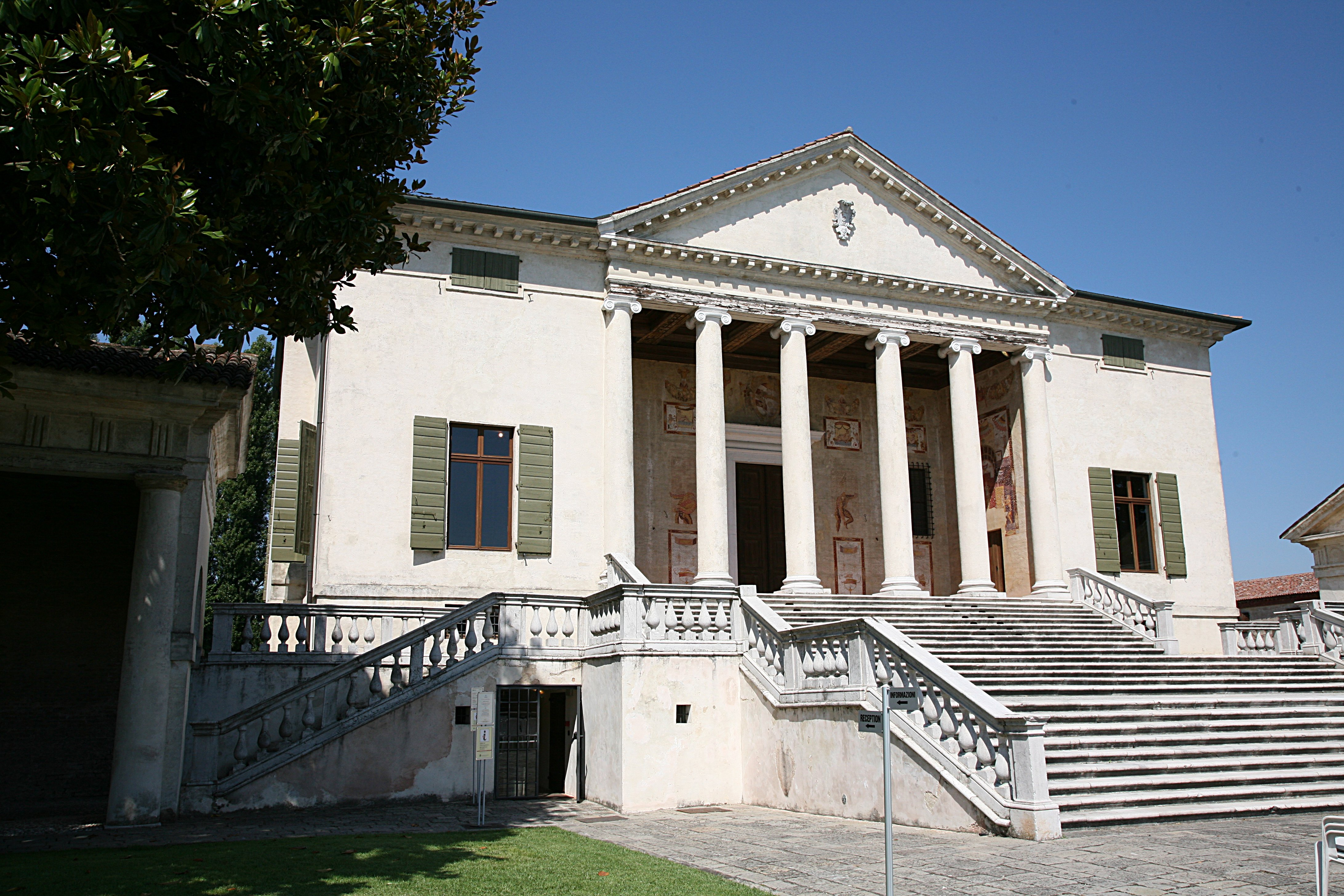
Portico of the Villa Badoer. The intertwined coats of arms of the Badoer and Loredan family are frescoed above the front door.

Francesco Badoer (1512–1572) was Venetian nobleman and politician.

Badoer was born at Venice on 5 September 1512, the son of Piero di Albertino. He belonged to a minor branch of the Badoer family and was the second of three sons. In 1536, he married Lucietta Loredan. They had four sons and two daughters.

In 1538, Lucietta's brother, Zorzi, died intestate. His vast inheritance was divided between his widow's two brothers and his two sisters' husbands. The division took a decade to resolve, but left Badoer in possession of 460 acres in the Polesine. In 1556, he hired Andrea Palladio to design for him a new house at Fratta. Construction on the Villa Badoer began in 1557.

Badoer had an undistinguished public career. He was a member of the Ducal Council and the Senate. In 1562, Badoer was captain of Bergamo. He died in 1572.
