= Wing of the Villa Thiene (Cicogna) =

Coordinates: 45.5031°N 11.7923°E

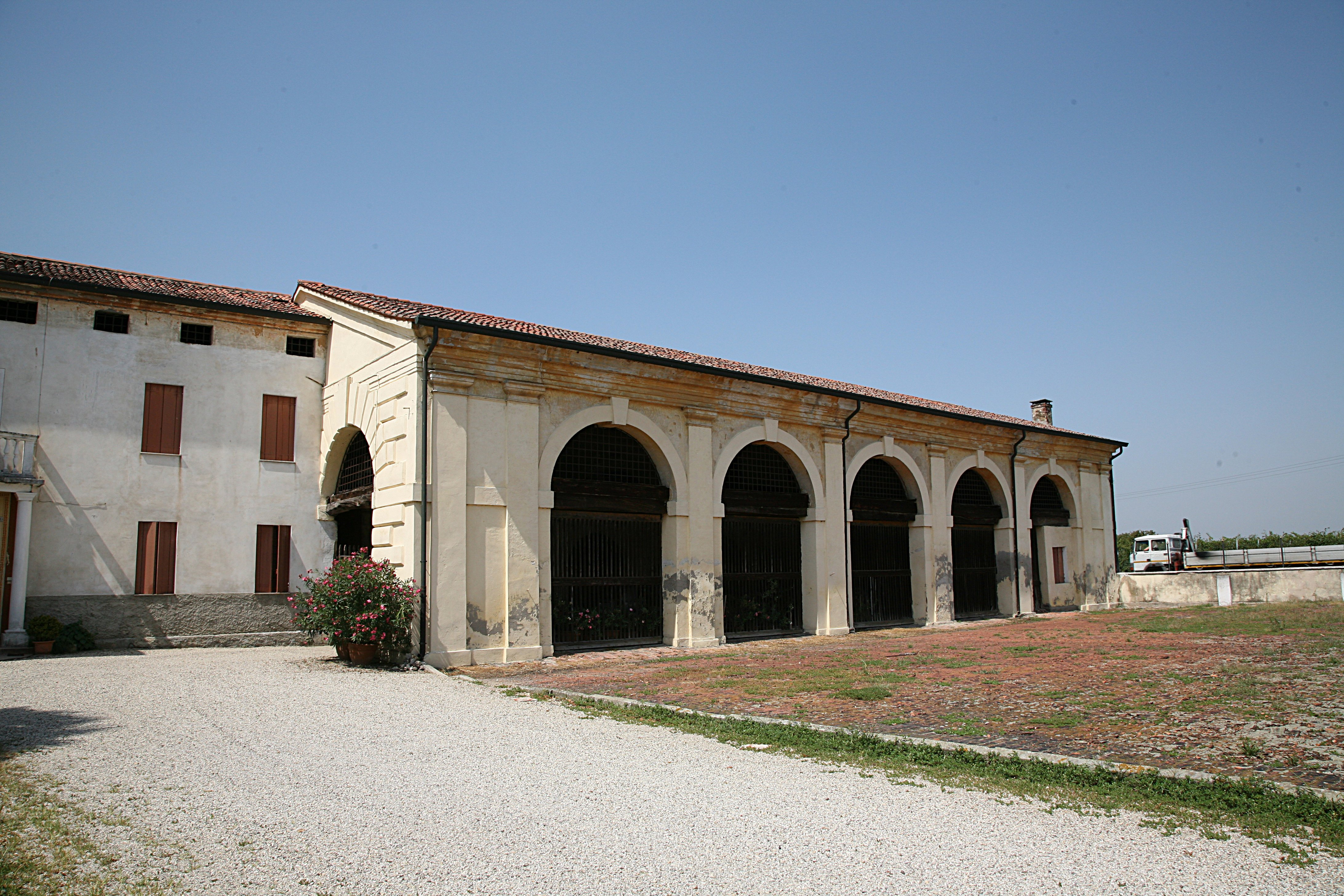
Wing of the Villa Thiene

The Wing of the Villa Thiene is a construction designed by Italian Renaissance architect Andrea Palladio, located in Cicogna, a hamlet in the comune of Villafranca Padovana in the Veneto region of Italy.

The barchessa (wing) which exists today was only part of an ambitious project drawn up by Andrea Palladio for Francesco Thiene and his sons Odoardo and Teodoro.

== History ==
In I quattro libri dell'architettura (1570) Palladio states that it was Francesco who initiated building works, and since he died in 1556 it is probable that Palladio’s project must have been conceived previously. In 1563, building works were in full swing, and a map dating from the following year well represents the state of the works which would halt in 1567, when Odoardo hastily abandoned Vicenza fleeing into Protestant territory for religious reasons.

Andrea Palladio was probably Odoardo’s personal friend, since he actually assisted him at the alarming moment of his flight, and witnessed the notarial act which nominated Odoardo’s brother Teodoro trustee of the properties he necessarily abandoned behind him.

== Architecture ==
The project for Villa Thiene is documented by an engraving in the Quattro libri; decidedly ambitious, it was characterised by a great loggia with a giant order, enclosed between towers arranged at the building’s four angles. A drawing by Marcantonio Palladio of the realised barchessa exists, which is extremely close to the executed form.

Both barchesse of the project should have been connected to the lordly house by two curvilinear porticos, identical to those designed by Palladio in 1554 for the Villa Badoer at Fratta Polesine.

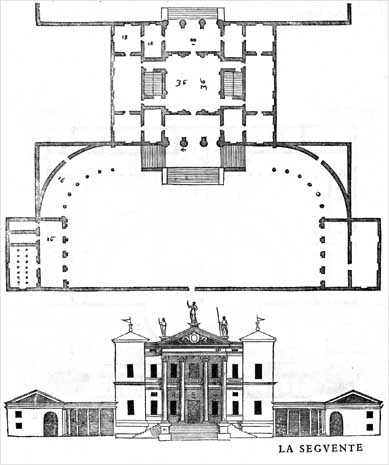
Villa Thiene in I quattro libri dell'architettura

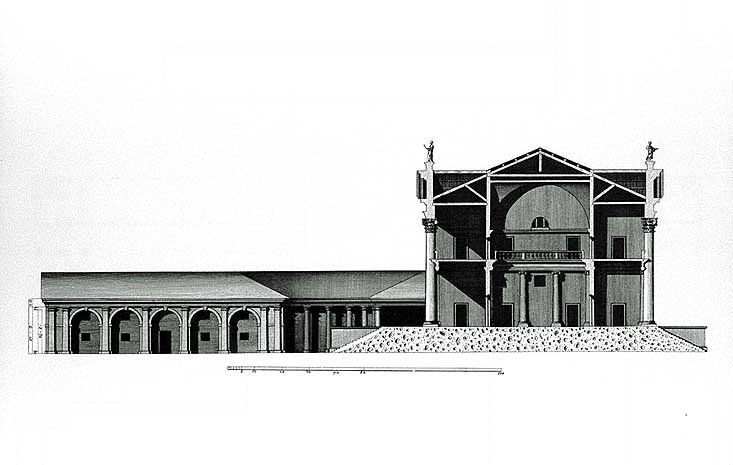
Cross section (drawing by Ottavio Bertotti Scamozzi, 1781)

== See also ==
- Palladian Villas of the Veneto
- Palladian architecture
