= Giovanni Badoer =

Venetian poet, politician and diplomat

Giovanni Badoer or Zuan Badoer (c. 1465 – January 1535) was a poet, politician and diplomat of the Republic of Venice.

Badoer was the resident ambassador in Spain (1498–1499; 1512–1514), Naples (1500–1501), Hungary (1501–1503), the Holy See (1507–1508) and France (1516–1517; 1520–1524), and special ambassador to Poland (1502) and the Holy See (1534). The low point of his career came with his failure to stop the League of Cambrai in 1509. He was podestà of Chioggia (1504–1506), Brescia (1518–1519) and Padua (1531–1532), and captain of Verona (1525–1526). He played a leading role in the reform of Venetian statutes in 1528–1529.

In his youth, Badoer wrote poetry. He obtained a doctorate from the University of Padua and a knighthood in Hungary. He was also a patron of humanist scholars recovering the classics, such as Giorgio Valla and Vettor Fausto.

== Education and entry into politics ==
Giovanni was born around 1465. His father was Renier, his uncle the noted diplomat Andrea Badoer. He obtained a doctorate from the University of Padua, where he befriended Pietro Bembo. In his youth, he composed three eclogues under the title Filareto all'aurea sua catena in the style of the Arcadia of Jacopo Sannazzaro. He was the patron of Giorgio Valla, who dedicated some translated ancient Greek mathematical texts to him in 1498.

At the start of his public career, Marino Sanuto the Younger praised Giovanni as learned, humane and gracious. He was already the provveditore di Comun when, on 3 July 1498, he was named ambassador to Spain. He arrived at the Spanish court on 3 December. His term was short, for he was recalled in February 1499 after Venice entered into an alliance with Louis XII of France. On his return journey, he was fêted by the duke of Milan, Ludovico Sforza, who sought an alliance with Venice. A few days after his return to Venice in July 1499, he was made a senator.

== Early diplomacy and knighthood ==
On 16 January 1500, Giovanni was elected orator to the Kingdom of Naples, although he did not set out until 29 October. He secured grain supplies from the kingdom, since Venice's imports from the Balkans had been interrupted by its war with the Ottomans. As Louis XII threatened Naples with invasion, he was ordered to withdraw. He was back in Venice by August 1501, when he was elected orator to the Kingdom of Hungary. He left in November with the goal of bringing Hungary into the war against the Ottomans. Immediately upon his arrival in Buda, he was ordered to go to Poland to congratulate the new King Alexander on his accession. He remained in Poland some months. From February 1503 to January 1504, he was the head of Venice's mission in Buda. On 8 January 1504, he was made a knight by King Vladislaus II.

On 13 December 1504, Giovanni was named podestà of Chioggia. In October 1506, he became avogadore di Comun. On 22 December, he was elected ambassador to the Holy See. He arrived in Rome in March 1507. Early in 1508, on the eve of the War of the League of Cambrai, he met with Costantino Arianiti, who suggested that Pope Julius II would break up the league if Venice handed over Rimini and Faenza. He was unable to prevent a papal declaration of war and left Rome on 18 June 1509.

== Post-blacklist diplomacy ==
Giovanni was effectively blacklisted for two years following the disastrous war. In July 1511 and again in March 1512, he was elected one of the savi di Terraferma. In the interim, he was elected to the zonta of the Council of Ten. In June 1512, he set out as orator to Spain. His main job was to justify Venice's new alliance with France, which put her at odds with Spain. He was back in Venice by January 1514, having failed to prevent Hispano-Venetian hostilities in Italy.

In 1516, Giovanni was again a savio di Terraferma. Around that time, he encouraged Vettor Fausto's translation of the Pseudo-Aristotelian Mechanics into Latin. In 1516–1517, he was ambassador to France. In 1517, he was named podestà of Brescia. He served for a year and a half before returning to France as ambassador in 1520. In June 1520, he was the Venetian representative at the Field of the Cloth of Gold, where King Francis I met with Henry VIII of England. His reports are a valuable source for the meeting. Later that year, he held Francis I's daughter, Madeleine, at the baptismal font in the name of Venice. After the outbreak of the Four Years' War, he vainly urged Francis to come to Italy with an army. The Treaty of Brussels with the Holy Roman Empire in 1523 ended Venice's French policy.

== Later years and statutory reform ==
Between February 1525 and May 1526, Giovanni was captain of Verona. In October 1526, he joined the zonta of the senate, where he successfully argued against breaking the treaty with the Empire to help the pope. In 1528, the Doge Andrea Gritti charged Badoer, Daniele Renier and Francesco Bragadin with reforming the Venetian statutes, first set down in the 13th century. For this purpose, the committee of three were elected to the senate and the Maggior Consiglio. The result of their labour was the Libro d'Oro Vecchio, published in 1529. In this work, Badoer, as a doctor, took the lead.

From 25 July 1531 to 9 September 1532, Giovanni was podestà of Padua. In his final years, he was one of the savi del Consiglio and sat on the Council of Ten and its zonta. In 1534, he was one of the delegation sent to congratulate Pope Paul III on his election. He died in January 1535.

== Bibliography ==
- Campana, Lilia (2014). The Immortal Fausto: The Life, Works, and Ships of the Venetian Humanist and Naval Architect Vettor Fausto (1490–1546) (PDF) (PhD diss.). Texas A&M University.
- Concina, Ennio (1988). "Humanism on the Sea". Mediterranean Historical Review. 3 (1): 159–165. doi:10.1080/09518968808569544.
- Richardson, Glenn (2013). The Field of Cloth of Gold. Yale University Press.
- Tiepolo, Maria Francesca (1984). "Libro d'Oro Vecchio". In Jane Martineau; Charles Hope (eds.). The Genius of Venice, 1500–1600. Harry N. Abrams. pp. 395–396.
- Ventura, Angelo (1963). "Badoer, Giovanni". Dizionario Biografico degli Italiani (in Italian). Vol. 5: Bacca–Baratta. Rome: Istituto dell'Enciclopedia Italiana. OCLC 883370.
- Wiethoff, William E. (1987). "Rhetoric and Law in Pietro Bembo's Opere". Rhetorica: A Journal of the History of Rhetoric. 5 (3): 265–278.
