= Paul of Venice =

Venetian Catholic theologian (1369–1429)

Paolo Nicoletti Veneto OSA
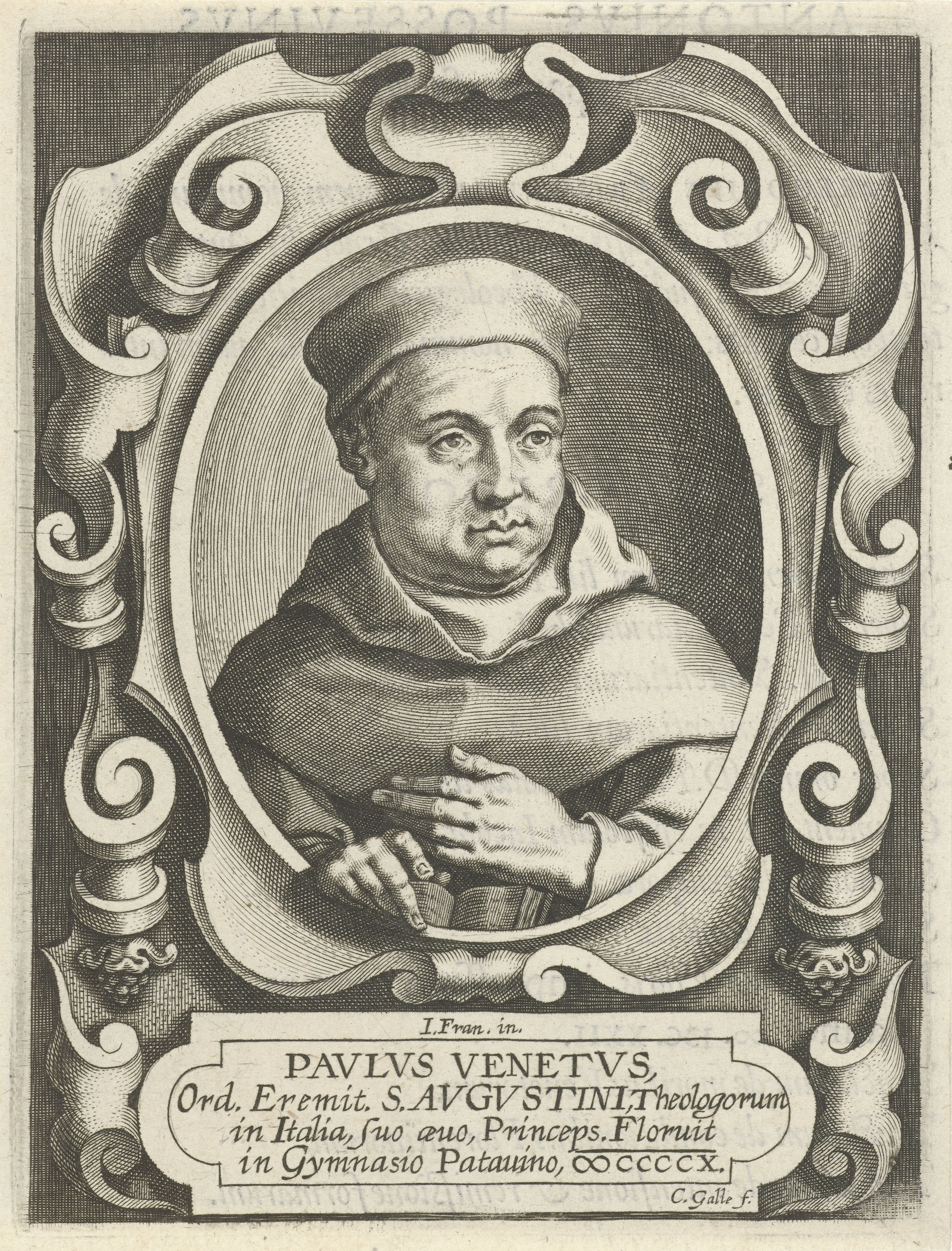
- Paul of Venice
- Born: c. 1369; Udine, Patriarchate of Aquileia
- Died: 15 June 1429 (aged 59–60); Padua, Republic of Venice

Education
- Education: University of Padua; University of Oxford

Philosophical work
- Era: Medieval philosophy
- Region: Western philosophy
- School: Scholasticism; Medieval realism
- Notable students: Paolo da Pergola, Gaetano da Thiene
- Main interests: Metaphysics, logic, ontology, epistemology

Paul of Venice OSA (or Paulus Venetus; 1369–1429) was a Catholic philosopher, theologian, logician and metaphysician of the Order of Saint Augustine.

== Life ==
Paul was born, according to the chroniclers of his order, at Udine, about 1369 and died at Venice on 15 June 1429, as Paolo Nicoletti. He joined the Augustinian Order at the age of 14, at the convent of Santo Stefano in Venice. In 1390 he is said to have been sent to Oxford for his studies in theology, but returned to Italy, and finished his course at the University of Padua, becoming a Doctor of Arts and Theology in 1405. He lectured in the Universities of Padua, Siena, Perugia, and Bologna during the first quarter of the fifteenth century. He was also a teacher to Paolo da Pergola.

Paul was also appointed Prior General of the Augustinian Order in 1409 by Pope Gregory XII, and also served as an ambassador to the Republic of Venice. Paul was one of the theologians called to Rome in 1427 by Pope Martin V to defend the orthodoxy of St. Bernardino of Siena, occasioned by Bernardino's use of inscriptions of the name of Jesus in worship. In 1429, Paul died in Padua, while he was completing his commentary on Aristotle's De Anima.

== Philosophical work ==
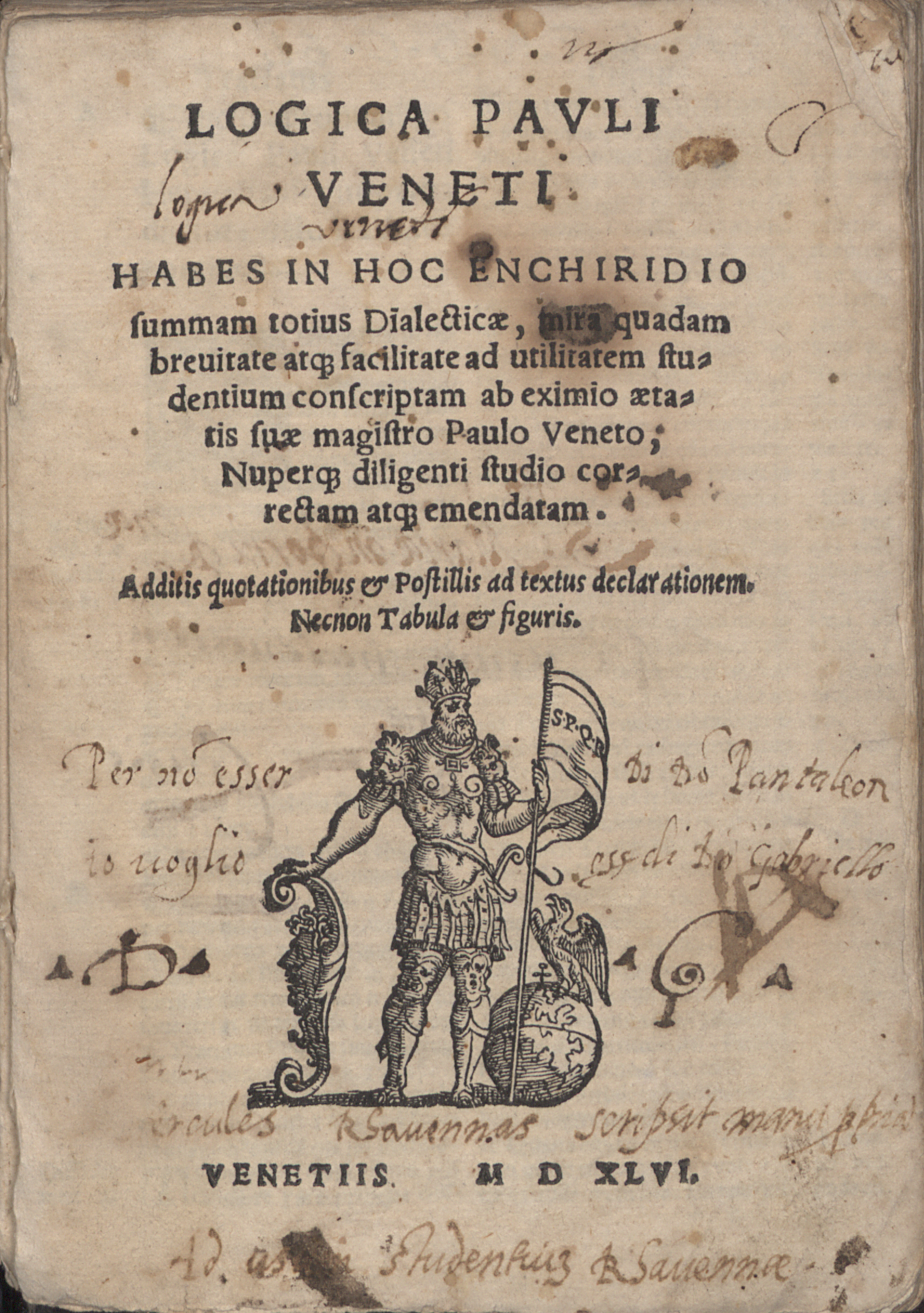
Logica, 1546

Paul's philosophy has been categorised within the realist tradition of medieval thought. Following on from John Wycliffe and the subsequent Oxonians who followed him, Paul further developed this new brand of realism, and further renewed Walter Burley’s opposition to nominalism. Paul's metaphysical theses are rooted fundamentally in Scotist thought. Duns Scotus maintained the doctrine of the univocity of being and the existence of the universal forms of objects outside of the person's mind. He also maintained Scotus' notion of the real identity and the formal distinction between essence and being, alongside the notion of "thisness" as the principle of individuation. Paul was also simultaneously influenced by other thinkers of the Scholastic period, including the Dominican thinkers Albert the Great and Thomas Aquinas, and his fellow Augustinian, Giles of Rome. Paul also critically engaged with the works and doctrines of fourteenth-century nominalists such as William Ockham, John Buridan, and Marsilius of Inghen, and sometimes gauged these thinkers' theses against each other to undermine their positions.

== Works ==
His writings show a wide knowledge and interest in the scientific problems of his time.

- Commentaries on the works of Aristotle:
  - Expositio in libros Posteriorum Aristotelis.
  - Expositio super VIII libros Physicorum necnon super Commento Averrois (1409).
  - Expositio super libros De generatione et corruptione.
  - Lectura super librum De Anima.
  - Conclusiones Ethicorum.
  - Conclusiones Politicorum.
  - Expositio super Praedicabilia et Praedicamenta (1428).
- Logical works:
  - Logica Parva or Tractatus Summularum (1395–96).
  - Logica Magna (1397–98).
  - Quadratura.
  - Sophismata Aurea.
- Other works:
  - Super Primum Sententiarum Johannis de Ripa Lecturae Abbreviatio (1401).
  - Summa philosophiae naturalis (1408).
  - De compositione mundi.
  - Quaestiones adversus Judaeos.
  - Sermones.
- Logica (in Latin). Pavia: Antonio Carcano. 1483.
- Logica (in Latin). Venezia: Bartolomeo Imperatore & Francesco Imperatore. 1546.

=== English translations ===
- Logica Parva. München: Philosophia Verlag 1984.

Translation of the 1472 Edition with introduction and notes by Alan R. Perreiah.

- Logica Magna. Tractatus de suppositionibus. St. Bonaventure, NY: Franciscan Institute 1971.

Edited and translated by Alan R. Perreiah

- Logica Magna. Part I Fascicule 1: Tractatus de terminis. Oxford: Oxford University Press 1979.

Edited with an English translation and notes by Norman Kretzmann.

- Logica Magna. Part I Fascicule 7: Tractatus De scire et dubitare. Oxford: Oxford University Press 1981.

Edited with an English translation and notes by Patricia Clarke.

- Logica Magna. Part I Fascicule 8: Tractatus De necessitate et contingentia futurorum. Oxford: Oxford University Press 1991.

Edited with an English translation and notes by C. J. F. Williams.

- Logica Magna. Part II Fascicule 3: Tractatus De hypotheticis. Oxford: Oxford University Press 1990.

Edited with an English translation and notes by Alexander Broadie.

- Logica Magna. Part II Fascicule 4: Capitula De conditionali et de rationali. Oxford: Oxford University Press 1990.

Edited with an English translation and notes by George Edward Hughes.

- Logica Magna. Part II Fascicule 6: Tractatus de veritate et falsitate propositionis et Tractatus de significato propositionis. Oxford: Oxford University Press 1978.

Edited with notes on the sources by Francesco del Punta; translated into English with explanatory notes by Marilyn McCord Adams.

- Logica Magna. Part II Fascicule 8: Tractatus De obligationibus. Oxford: Oxford University Press 1988.

Edited with an English translation and notes by E. Jennifer Ashworth.

== See also ==
- Problem of universals
- Realism (philosophy)
