= Pietro Badoer =

Duke of Crete from 1358 to 1360

Pietro Badoer (died 1371) was a Venetian patrician who served as duke of Crete in 1358–1360. His career was derailed by his closeness to the disgraced Doge Marino Faliero and he was banished twice, the second time for poisoning his wife.

== Rise ==
Pietro was born at Venice in the first two decades of the 14th century. His father was Andrea Badoer, which distinguishes him from a contemporary member of the extended Badoer family also named Pietro, who was the son of a certain Marino. Pietro attained knightly rank. At an unknown date, he married Filippa, a niece of Doge Bartolomeo Gradenigo.

From 1355 to 1357, Pietro held the office of count of Zara. He was the penultimate Venetian governor before the fall of Zara to the Kingdom of Hungary. From 22 August 1358 until 14 July 1360, he was the duke of Crete, Venice's governor on the island. Having met with an ambassador on 21 September, he signed a treaty with Musa, emir of Menteshe, on 13 October 1358. It is a treaty of peace and trade, mainly confirming the earlier treaty of 1337. It was valid for the life of the emir. He continued to hold a high military office on the island after his governorship was over.

In December 1360, in the aftermath of Marino Faliero's failed coup d'état, Pietro was denounced to the Council of Ten for having uttered words "against the honour of the Signoria" during his governorship. He is supposed to have boasted openly of his friendship with Faliero. His successor as duke, Marino Grimani, was instructed to investigate. In the event, Pietro was never brought to trial. A certain Caterino—perhaps Pietro's brother—is said to have offered to supply 4,000 men to help make Pietro doge, but the latter claimed to have "no mind" for a coup.

== Downfall ==
In October 1362, Pietro was sought by the Ten for some unspecified crime. An inquisitor was sent to find him in Mestre, but he fled and was tried in absentia. Convicted on 22 October and sentenced to perpetual banishment, he was found residing in the house of Prosdocimo da Brazolo in Padua. He was ordered to leave Venetian territory within fifteen days.

In 1364, Filippa obtained a reduction in Pietro's sentence, but he had by then become alienated from Venetian society and his own family. He tried four times to poison her with arsenic, finally succeeding. She died in the convent of San Lorenzo in 1368, having drawn up her will on 31 July.

For his murder of his wife, Pietro was sentenced again to perpetual banishment and spent the rest of his life wandering about Italy. He had an illegitimate son, Simonetto, and eventually married an Anconitan woman named Simonetta. They had two daughters, Tominasina and Fina, in his lifetime and Simonetta was pregnant at the time of his death in late 1371. He drew up his will for the first time in November 1369 and then revised it on 14 July 1371 while he was gravely ill. He left thousands of ducats to his illegitimate child, the children of Simonetta (born and unborn) and an otherwise unknown wife named Fioruzza and asked to be buried in Venice, in Santa Maria Gloriosa dei Frari.

== Bibliography ==
- Brunelli, Vitaliano (1913). Storia della città di Zara dai tempi più remoti sino al MDCCCXV. Venice: Istituto veneto di arti grafiche.
- Cracco, Giorgio (1963). "Badoer, Pietro". Dizionario Biografico degli Italiani (in Italian). Vol. 5: Bacca–Baratta. Rome: Institute of the Italian Encyclopaedia. OCLC 883370.
- Dibello, Daniele (2018). "La stabilità delle istituzioni veneziane nel Trecento: Aspetti politici, economici e culturali nella gestione della congiura di Marino Falier". Reti Medievali Rivista. 19 (2): 85–129. doi:10.6092/1593-2214/5946.
- Hazlitt, William Carew (1900). The Venetian Republic: Its Rise, Its Growth, and Its Fall 421–1797. Vol. 1: 421–1422. London: Adam and Charles Black.
- Lazzarini, Vittorio (1897). "Marino Faliero: la congiura". Nuovo Archivio Veneto. 13: 5–107, 277–374.
- Pedani, Maria Pia (2020). "Muslim Ambassadors to Venice up to the 16th century". In Nicolas Drocourt (ed.). La figure de l'ambassadeur entre mondes éloignés: Ambassadeurs, envoyés officiels et représentations diplomatiques entre Orient islamique, Occident latin et Orient chrétien (XI^{e}–XVI^{e} siècle). Enquêtes et documents. Rennes: Presses universitaires de Rennes. pp. 151–158. ISBN 9782753564251.
- Ratti Vidulich, Paola, ed. (1976). Duca di Candia: Quaternus Consiliorum, 1340–1350. Venice: Comitato per la pubblicazione delle fonti relative alla storia di Venezia.
- Thiriet, Freddy, ed. (1966). Délibérations des assemblées vénitiennes concernant la Romanie. Vol. 1: 1160–1363. Paris: Mouton.
- Zachariadou, Elizabeth A. (1983). Trade and Crusade: Venetian Crete and the Emirates of Menteshe and Aydin (1300–1415). Venice.
