= Vettor Fausto =

Venetian Renaissance humanist and naval architect

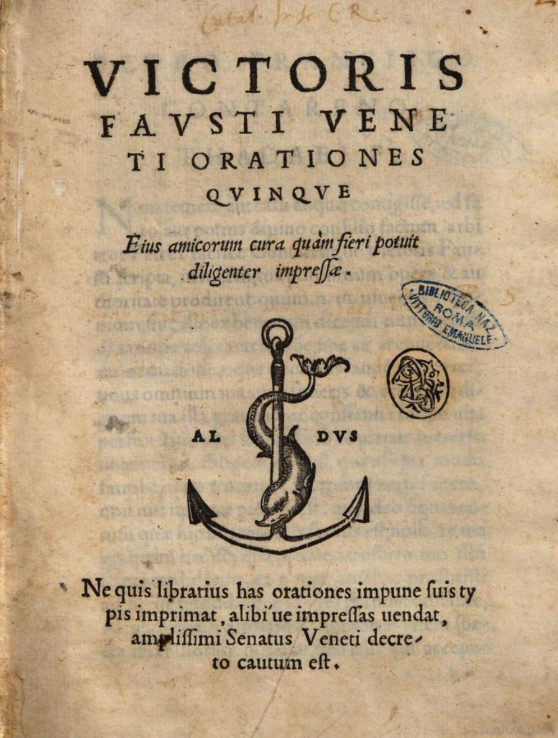
Titlepage of Fausto's posthumous Orationes quinque

Vettor Fausto or Vittore Fausto (1490–1546) was Venetian Renaissance humanist and naval architect. He was an expert in Greek and the classics. He worked as a copyist and a soldier in his youth. His studies led him to propose the construction of a quinquereme, a galley with five rowers per bench. He published original poetry in Greek, had a hand in the publication of the Complutensian Polyglot Bible and edited classical texts for publication, most notably the Aristotelis Mechanica, which he translated into Latin. In his later years he grew disillusioned with Venetian politics, even being accused of treason.

== Life ==
=== Education and work as a scribe ===
Fausto was born in 1490 to a modest family of Greek origin. They probably immigrated to Venice from Cephalonia. Fausto was a Venetian citizen by birth and a native of the city. His original name, in Latin, was Lucius Victor Falchonius. By 1511, he had adopted a different surname, going by Victor Faustus in Latin and Niketas Phaustos in Greek. According to Paolo Ramusio, he was a child prodigy, although nothing is known of his early education. Besides Latin and Greek, he learned some Hebrew and Aramaic. In 1508–1509, he studied under, worked for and lived with the professor Gerolamo Maserio at the Scuola di San Marco. He was made to copy out Greek texts, such as John Tzetzes and some commentaries on Aeschylus.

Fausto published his first Greek epigram in 1509 in Giovanni Tacuino's edition of Noctes Atticae by Aulus Gellius. In 1510, he was offered a teaching job in Lucca by Aulo Giano Parrasio. According to a letter he wrote to Jacopo Sannazaro in early 1511, Parrasio absconded with 90 of his books, abandoning him at Chioggia. The letter is valuable for the light it sheds on Fausto's reading up to that point. The majority of his books were in Greek: Aeschylus, Plutarch, Theocritus, Athenaeus, Lucian, Nikephoros Blemmydes and Cyril of Alexandria.

In 1511, Fausto joined Marco Musuro as a pupil and copyist. His adoption of the name Fausto around this time may have been related to his entering the Aldine Academy. In 1511, he published an edition of Terence's comedies with his own treatise, De comoedia libellus, and editions of three works by Cicero. All of these were printed by Lazzaro de' Soardi. He published a second Greek epigram in his edition of Terence. In 1512, he published a third Greek epigram in Urbano Bolzanio's Grammaticae Institutiones. The completion of his education is uncertain, but Marino Sanudo calls him a doctor.

=== Spain, the army and France ===
In 1512, Fausto went to Spain. He probably brought with him Tacuino's Greek type for use in the fifth volume of the Complutensian Polyglot Bible, published in 1514. Although his overall role with the bible was minor, he did contribute one of the introductory Greek epigrams praising the project's founded, Francisco Jiménez de Cisneros. Cisneros offered him a professorship of Greek at the University of Alcalá, but he declined. He left Spain in 1513. During his time in Spain, he befriended the Venetian ambassador, Giovanni Badoer.

From 1513 to 1515, during the War of the League of Cambrai, Fausto served in the Venetian army in the Terraferma under Bartolomeo d'Alviano. His immediate superior was the condottiero Baldassare Scipione. In 1516, Badoer was named ambassador to France and brought Fausto with him. In Paris, Fausto joined the literary circle around Guillaume Budé. In 1517, he published a Latin translation of the Aristotelis Mechanica dedicated to Badoer. This was a critical edition based on over twenty manuscripts. It was published at Paris by Josse Bade. According to Lilia Campana:

Fausto's authorship greatly contributed to the restoration of Greek science in the Western world and inaugurated a new field of study devoted to mechanical questions. It also enacted a cultural process that gradually led to the legitimization of the artes mechanicae, paving the way for the scientific revolution [...] It was because of Fausto's contribution to Renaissance science that sixteenth-century Venetian Humanism, in its last phase, embraced topics focusing on banausic arts and, in doing so, legitimized the ars mechanica into a scientia. . . The integration of mathematics, mechanics, and other scientific topics into Venetian Renaissance culture is affirmed by the organization of the Accademia Veneziana in 1557.

At some point, Fausto visited Germany, but the chronology of his travels between 1512 and 1518 is not completely certain.

=== Professor and naval architect ===
In 1518, Fausto returned to Venice. He was offered a chair teaching Greek by the Republic of Ragusa, but declined. He competed for and won the chair of Greek at the Scuola di San Marco, although his rival, Egnazio, complained of "machinations". Sanudo praised Fausto's winning lectures on Lucian and the Argonautica Orphica. Fausto held the chair from 16 October 1518 until at least 1529. In 1524, he was lecturing on Hesiod and Pindar.

During this period, Fausto wrote his Orationes quinque (Five Orations). He also began theoretical work on the quinquereme, which he first proposed to the Arsenal in 1525. In 1526, he was authorized by the Venetian Senate to build one. It was, he claimed, based on an ancient Greek design. Fausto's version had "five rowers on a single bench, each pulling a separate oar." Years later, Galileo Galilei referred to it was the "great galleass". It underwent sea trials in 1529. Although faster than lighter galleys at short distances, it was inefficient over longer ranges. Only one was ever built.

=== Disillusionment ===
In 1530, Fausto succeeded Andrea Navagero as librarian of what would become the Biblioteca Marciana, including the collection granted to Venice by Cardinal Bessarion. In 1530, he was approached by the French ambassador, Lazare de Baïf, to work in France. He refused, but became disillusioned with his work in Venice in the years that followed. Accused of treason by agents of Charles V, Holy Roman Emperor, he was arrested and tortured in 1539. He was accused of planning to go to France to help construct ships. At the time, France was allied with the Ottoman Empire against Charles V and Venice. There were rumours that Fausto was murdered, but he was eventually declared innocent and released.

In July 1546, Fausto contacted the Florentine ambassador to negotiate a move to Florence, but nothing came of it. This is the last record of Fausto alive. He probably died towards the end of the year. He never married, had no children and did not make a will. His sister, Apollonia, claimed his few belongings in January 1547. His Orationes quinque were published posthumously by the Aldine Press in 1551, dedicated to Pier Francesco Contarini with a brief introductory biography of Fausto by Paolo Ramusio.

== Writings ==
An epigram composed by Fausto for the Complutensian Polyglot in 1514

Fausto's known published writings are:

- four Greek epigrams (1509–1514)
- an edition of Terence's comedies with his own Latin treatise on ancient comedy, De comoedia libellus (Venice, 1511)
- an edition of Cicero's De officiis, De amicitia and Paradoxa (Venice, 1511)
- a translation of the Aristotelis Mechanica (Paris, 1517)
- Orationes quinque (Venice, 1551)

In addition to the published works above, Fausto left unpublished a Latin epigram in a manuscript now in the Biblioteca Estense. He also made marginal annotations in his copy of the editio princeps of Homer's Iliad, published at Florence in 1488. This copy survives and is now in the Biblioteca Marciana, shelfmark Gr. IX 35 (=1082). His notes show that he had access to the famous Homeric codex Venetus A, which was in the Biblioteca Marciana (Gr. Z 454 [=822]).

There are a total of twelve surviving letters sent by or to Fausto. This is only a small fraction of his correspondence, but it shows that he corresponded in Greek, Latin and Italian. His known correspondents include Andrea Navagero, Jacopo Sannazaro, Pietro Bembo, Giovanni Battista Ramusio, Marino Becichemo, Lucilio Maggi "Philalteus" and Giustino Decadio.

== Bibliography ==
- Campana, Lilia (2010). Vettor Fausto (1490–1546), Professor of Greek and a Naval Architect: A New Light on the 16th-century Manuscript "Misure di vascelli etc. di…proto dell'Arsenale di Venetia" (PDF) (MA thesis). Texas A&M University.
- Campana, Lilia (2014). The Immortal Fausto: The Life, Works, and Ships of the Venetian Humanist and Naval Architect Vettor Fausto (1490–1546) (PDF) (PhD diss.). Texas A&M University.
- Campana, Lilia (2017). "Vettor Fausto (1490–1546), Professor of Greek at the School of Saint Mark" (PDF). In Federica Ciccolella; Luigi Silvano (eds.). Teachers, Students, and Schools of Greek in the Renaissance. Brill. pp. 311–341.
- Campana, Lilia (2018). "The Defence of the Venetian Dominio Da Mar in the Sixteenth Century: Ship Design, Naval Architecture, and the Naval Career of Vettor Fausto's Quinquereme" (PDF). In Georgios Theotokis; Aysel Yıldız (eds.). A Military History of the Mediterranean Sea: Aspects of War, Diplomacy, and Military Elites. Brill. pp. 44–78.
- Campbell, Gordon, ed. (2003). "Fausto, Vettor". The Oxford Dictionary of the Renaissance. Oxford University Press. ISBN 978-0-19-860175-3.
- Ferreiro, Larrie D. (2010). "The Aristotelian Heritage in Early Naval Architecture, From the Venice Arsenal to the French Navy, 1500–1700". Theoria: An International Journal for Theory, History and Foundations of Science. 25 (2): 227–241. doi:10.1387/theoria.617. hdl:10810/39435.
- Morantin, Patrick (2016). "Un témoin de la lecture du Venetus A à la Renaissance: l'édition princeps d'Homère annotée par Vettor Fausto (Marcianus gr. IX. 35)". Revue d'histoire des textes. 11: 95–133. doi:10.1484/J.RHT.5.110487.
- Morantin, Patrick (2017). Lire Homère à la Renaissance: Philologie humaniste et tradition grecque. Droz.
- Murphy, Stephen (2019). "Review of Morantin 2017". Renaissance Quarterly. 72 (3): 1005–1007. doi:10.1017/rqx.2019.264. S2CID 204475043.
- Piovan, Francesco (1995). "Fausto, Vittore". Dizionario Biografico degli Italiani (in Italian). Vol. 45: Farinacci–Fedrigo. Rome: Istituto dell'Enciclopedia Italiana. ISBN 978-88-12-00032-6.
- Rose, Paul Lawrence; Drake, Stillman (1971). "The Pseudo-Aristotelian Questions of Mechanics in Renaissance Culture". Studies in the Renaissance. 18: 65–104. doi:10.2307/2857079. JSTOR 2857079.
- Wilson, N. G. (1988). "Vettor Fausto, Professor of Greek and Naval Architect". In A. C. Dionisotti; Anthony Grafton; Jill Kraye (eds.). The Uses of Greek and Latin: Historical Essays. Warburg Institute, University of London. pp. 89–96.
