= C. J. F. Williams =

British philosopher (1930–1997)

- Born: 31 December 1930; Walsall, England, UK
- Died: 25 March 1997 (aged 66); Bristol, England, UK

Education
- Education: Balliol College, Oxford
- Doctoral advisor: I. M. Crombie
- Other advisor: R. M. Hare (tutor)

Philosophical work
- Era: 20th-century
- Region: Western philosophy
- School: Analytic philosophy
- Main interests: Philosophical logic, Ancient philosophy, philosophy of religion
- Notable ideas: Analytical accounts of existence, truth and identity

Christopher John Fardo Williams (31 December 1930 – 25 March 1997) was a British philosopher. His areas of interest were philosophical logic, on which topic he did most of his original work, and ancient philosophy, as an editor and translator.

== Life ==
Christopher Williams was born in Walsall and was educated at Shrewsbury School and Balliol College, Oxford where he took a First in Greats and became a convert to Roman Catholicism, a faith to which he was openly devoted for the rest of his life. Planning to enter the Benedictine Order, he became a novice at Downside Abbey, but shortly thereafter was affected by polio which left him paralysed from the waist down.

Instead he became an academic philosopher, lecturing at the University of Hull before moving to Bristol, where he taught in the philosophy department as lecturer, Reader and Professor until his retirement in 1996. Despite his disability, Williams commuted between Bristol and his home in Midsomer Norton and attended many philosophical conferences around the world. He also edited the philosophy journal, Analysis.

== Thought ==
Believing that such fundamental concepts as existence, truth and identity had been widely misunderstood by the philosophical tradition, and obfuscated especially by metaphysics, Williams attempted to show that they could be elucidated by a close analysis of the way those and related terms are actually used. Williams was not, however, an ordinary language philosopher; rather, he produced painstaking analyses of the concepts couched in the terms of symbolic logic. In this approach, founded in the logical work of Gottlob Frege, he was most immediately influenced by Arthur Prior and by his friend and fellow Roman Catholic philosopher Peter Geach.

He summarized his views in a trilogy of books, What is Truth? (1976), What is Existence? (1981) and What is Identity? (1989), and produced a more accessible overview, with less emphasis on symbolic logic, in a single volume, Being, Truth and Identity (1992).

== Works ==
Books (authored)

- What is Truth? (1976)
- What is Existence? (1981)
- What is Identity? (1989)
- Being, Truth and Identity (1992).

Select papers and book chapters

- "On Sameness and Selfhood", in Harry A. Lewis (ed.), Peter Geach: Philosophical Encounters (1991).

Other works

- (Translation. with notes), Aristotle, De generatione et corruptione (1982).
- (Edited. with translation and notes), Paul of Venice, Logica Magna [pt 1, fasc. 8], Tractatus de necessitate et contingentia futurorum (1991)
- (Translation) John Philoponus, On Aristotle's "On Coming-to-Be and Perishing" 1.1-5, and On Aristotle's "On Coming-to-Be and Perishing" 1.6-2.4 (1999)
