= Stefano Badoer =

13th century Venetian nobelman

Stefano Badoer (fl. 1227–1242) was a Venetian nobleman.

From 1227 to 1232, Stefano was the advocate of the convent of San Zaccaria. His brother Giovanni was a major early supporter of the Franciscans and Minoresses. In 1228, as podestà of Padua, Stefano waged war on Ezzelino III da Romano, who had occupied the castle of Fonte and imprisoned the castellan, Guglielmo da Camposampiero. In 1230, he was re-appointed podestà and led the Paduans against Ezzelino's Ghibellines, who had imprisoned Count Ricardo di Sanbonifacio in Verona. His term was extended through 1231. In that year he granted an exemption from some dues to San Zaccaria. He was drawn into the dispute over the body of Anthony of Padua, who died on 13 June 1231, when he sought to escort the body to Santa Maria Mater Domini (now part of the Basilica of Saint Anthony of Padua).

In September 1239, Stefano and Romeo Querini were ambassadors to Pope Gregory IX at Anagni. They agreed that the Republic of Venice would provide 25 galleys to the crusade against Frederick II to help the pope seize control of the Kingdom of Sicily. In 1240, under the papal legate Gregorio di Montelongo, Stefano commanded the allied forces at the siege of Ferrara. He then served as podestà of Ferrara from 1240 to 1242.

In 1242, Stefano was one of four noblemen charged by Doge Jacopo Tiepolo with codifying the Venetian constitution. The resulting five-volume Statutum novum was approved by the Minor Council and Major Council on 25 September 1242.

== Bibliography ==
- Carraro, Silvia; Rapetti, Anna (2015). "Female Monasteries in Venice: Religious Dynamics and Political Power". In Flocel Sabaté (ed.). Life and Religion in the Middle Ages. Cambridge Scholars Publishing. pp. 219–233.
- Cracco, Giorgio (1963). "Badoer, Stefano". Dizionario Biografico degli Italiani (in Italian). Vol. 5: Bacca–Baratta. Rome: Istituto dell'Enciclopedia Italiana. OCLC 883370.
- Gilliat-Smith, Ernest (1926). Saint Anthony of Padua According to His Contemporaries. J. M. Dent and Sons.
- Hyde, J. Kenneth (1966). Padua in the Age of Dante: A Social History of an Italian City-State. Manchester University Press.
