= Paolo della Pergola =

Italian humanist philosopher, mathematician and logician (died 1455)

Paolo della Pergola (died 1455, Venice) was an Italian humanist philosopher, mathematician and Occamist logician. He was a pupil of Paul of Venice.

== Works ==
Paolo della Pergola's most important work was probably De sensu composito et diviso. His logical works were printed early.

He taught at the Scuola di Rialto from 1421 to 1454. He was teacher and friend of the glassmaker Antonio Barovier.

Among his pupils was also Nicoletto Vernia, a well known professor of philosophy in Padua.

There is a memorial to him in San Giovanni Elemosinario, Venice.

- Logica; and, Tractatus de sensu composito et diviso by Paolo della Pergola, edited by Mary Anthony Brown, Saint Bonaventure, New York: Franciscan Institute, 1961.
