= Angelo Badoer =

Angelo Badoer (1565–1630) was a Venetian diplomat convicted of spying for Spain. He spent the last 18 years of his life in exile and survived two assassination attempts. He ended his life as a priest in Rome.

Angelo (or Anzolo) was born on 19 April 1565 to Alberto Badoer and Chiara Priuli. His uncle was Cardinal Lorenzo Priuli. His first diplomatic charge was to congratulate the Archduke Albert VII of Austria and Isabella Clara Eugenia on their marriage while they were passing through Milan in 1599. in 1600, he was sent to congratulate the Emperor Ferdinand II on his marriage to Maria Anna of Bavaria and also negotiate concerning the Uskoks. In 1602, he was elected ambassador to France, where he was from 1603 to 1605.

In 1605 and 1607, Badoer was a savio di Terraferma. As a member of the Senate during the Venetian Interdict (1606–1607), he argued the pro-papal position, reminding Venetians of their military weakness. In July 1607, without authorization, he met with the new papal nuncio, Cardinal Berlinghiero Gessi. This contravened rules on contact between Venetian patricians and foreign diplomats. In January 1608, the Council of Ten sentenced him to one year in prison, forbade him from knowing state secrets and banned him from going abroad. In 1610, the Spanish ambassador, Alfonso de la Cueva, recommended Badoer be paid an annual pension of 2,000 ducats for his spying services. When Badoer was accused in April 1612, he fled. Tried in absentia, he was given a lifetime ban and lost his patrician status.

In exile, Badoer first went to France, where he was under the protection of Charles, Duke of Guise. He continued to be an agent of Spain in France. He also served the Papacy and the Jesuits at various times and was in contact with Duke Charles Emmanuel of Savoy. He was forced to move about frequently. In Pamplona, he had talks with the Viceroy Alonso de Idiáquez. In 1615, he escaped a Venetian assassination attempt. He was in Paris in 1616 and Rome in 1617–1618. Pope Paul V ordered him to leave to avoid complications with the Venetians. In 1619, he was living in Provence under the name Francesco Cortese. He spent time in Brussels, where Alfonso de la Cueva was the Spanish ambassador. In 1620, he travelled under the name Monsignor Pianta between Amsterdam, Antwerp, Lorraine and London. He was in Rome again in September 1620.

In the summer of 1622, Badoer was in Madrid working for the election of Maffeo Barberini as Pope Urban VIII, who rewarded him with benefices in the diocese of Pavia, Ferrara and Cervia after he took holy orders. In 1624, he was sent to Paris to encourage France to end the War of Valtellina. In 1626, after France's treaty of Monzón with Spain, the Venetians made a second attempt on his life at Mâcon. He died at Rome in 1630. There were suspicions that he was poisoned. His papers were burned. A sealed letter addressed to the Venetian signoria was burned without being opened.

== Bibliography ==
- Gaeta, Franco (1963). "Badoer, Angelo". Dizionario Biografico degli Italiani, Volume 5: Bacca–Baratta (in Italian). Rome: Istituto dell'Enciclopedia Italiana. ISBN 978-8-81200032-6.
- De Vivo, Filippo (2007). Information and Communication in Venice: Rethinking Early Modern Politics. Oxford University Press.
