= Giacomo Badoer (born 1403) =

Venetian merchant

Giacomo Badoer (19 February 1403 – 1442×1445) was a Venetian merchant known for his surviving account book, the Libro di conti.

Giacomo was born in Venice to Sebastiano and Agnesina. He had two older brothers, Gerolamo and Maffeo, and a sister, Maria. He was registered in the Balla d'Oro on 4 July 1422. In 1425, he married Maria, daughter of Moisè of the Grimani family. They had two sons: Sebastiano (1427) and Gerolamo (1428).

In 1433, Giacomo was a member of the Council of Forty. In 1434, he won the right to operate a galley trading with Alexandria through the incanto di galere (galley auction). After his wife's death, he left his sons with his brother Gerolamo and travelled to Constantinople, where he arrived on 2 September 1436. He was a witness to the renewal for five years of Venice's treaty with the Byzantine Empire on 30 November. He remained in Constantinople until 1440.

Back in Venice in 1441, Giacomo married a daughter of Antonio Moro. This second marriage produced a daughter, Agnesina, who married Michele Malipiero di Alessandro. That same year, he was named podestà and captain of Bassano. He was still living when his successor was named in May 1442, but he was dead by 10 December 1445. The date of his death is unknown. He was buried in San Francesco della Vigna.

The Libro di conti (or Libro dei conti, 'book of accounts') is a record, in double-entry form, of Giacomo's business in Constantinople between 1436 and 1440. It is an invaluable source for commerce of Constantinople in this period. It shows that the city was mainly an entrepôt. Giacomo's annual business, which was average in scale, amounted to 126,000 hyperpyra. Although Greeks were heavily involved in trade, they provided relatively little capital. The Republic of Genoa's involvement outstripped that of Venice, while Byzantium had a trade deficit with the West.

== Bibliography ==
- Laiou, Angeliki E. (1991). "Badoer, Giacomo". In Kazhdan, Alexander (ed.). The Oxford Dictionary of Byzantium. Oxford and New York: Oxford University Press. ISBN 0-19-504652-8.
- Morozzo della Rocca, Raimondo; Bertelè, Tommaso (1963). "Badoer, Giacomo". Dizionario Biografico degli Italiani (in Italian). Vol. 5: Bacca–Baratta. Rome: Istituto dell'Enciclopedia Italiana. OCLC 883370.
