= Villa Badoer =

Coordinates: 45°1′49.27″N 11°38′23.50″E

UNESCO World Heritage Site
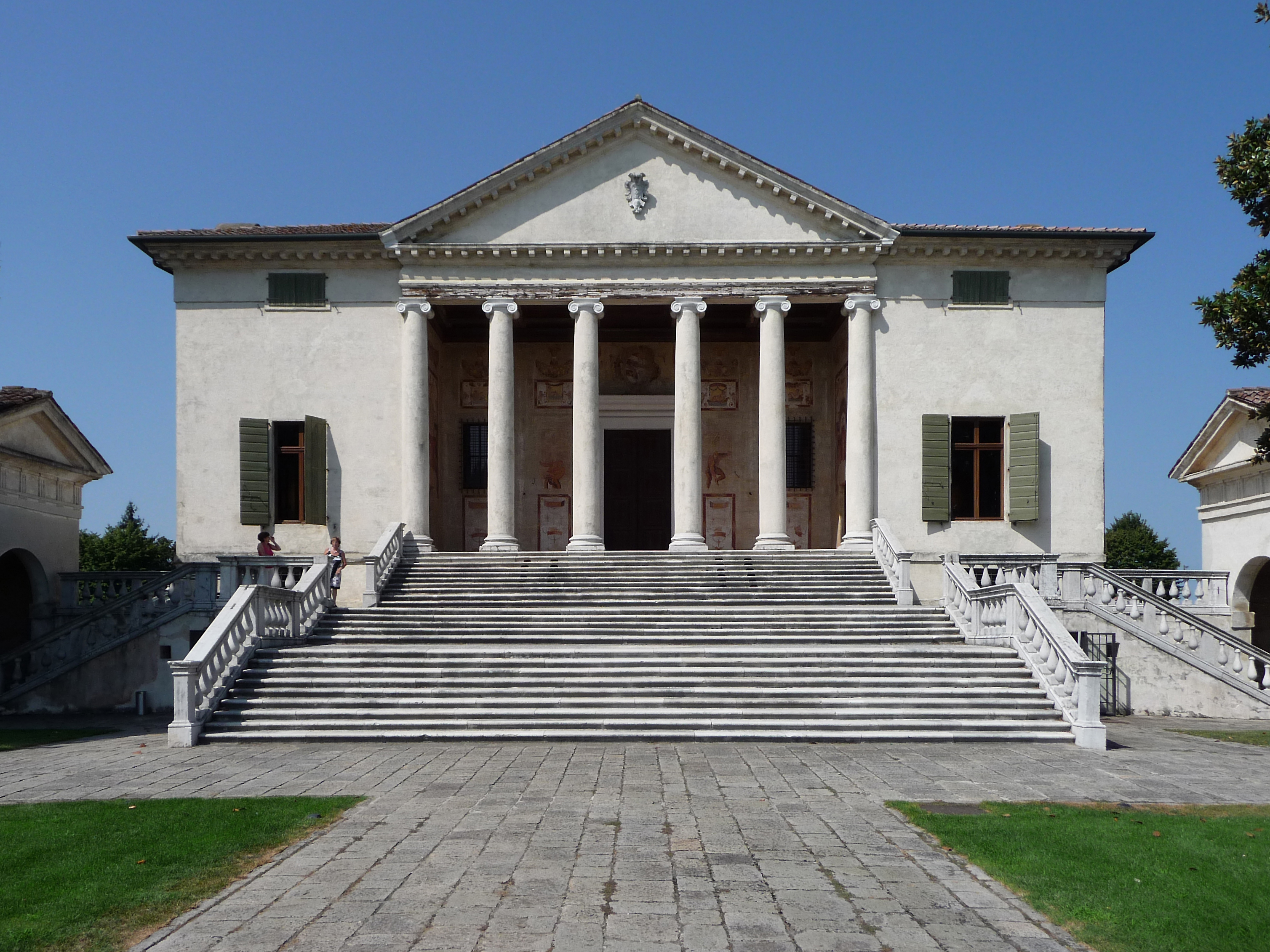
- Villa Badoer

- Location within Veneto Location within Italy
- Location: Fratta Polesine, province of Rovigo, Veneto, Italy
- Part of: City of Vicenza and the Palladian Villas of the Veneto
- Criteria: Cultural: (i), (ii)
- Reference: 712bis-024
- Inscription: 1994 (18th Session)
- Extensions: 1996

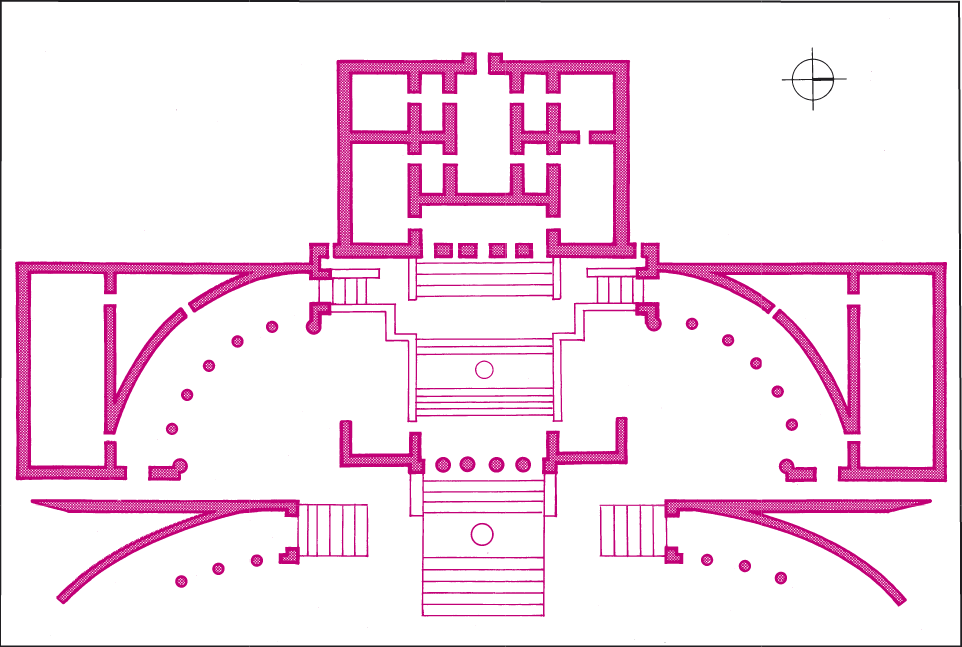
Building plan

Villa Badoer is a villa in Fratta Polesine, in the Veneto region of northern Italy. It was designed in 1556 by Italian Renaissance architect Andrea Palladio for the Venetian noble Francesco Badoer, and built between 1557 and 1563 on the site of a medieval castle, which guarded a bridge across a navigable canal. This was the first time Palladio used his fully developed temple pediment in the façade of a villa.

Villa Badoer has been part since 1996 of the UNESCO World Heritage Site "City of Vicenza and the Palladian Villas of the Veneto".

The building is open to the public and one of the wings houses the Museo archeologico nazionale di Fratta Polesine, opened in 2009.

== History ==
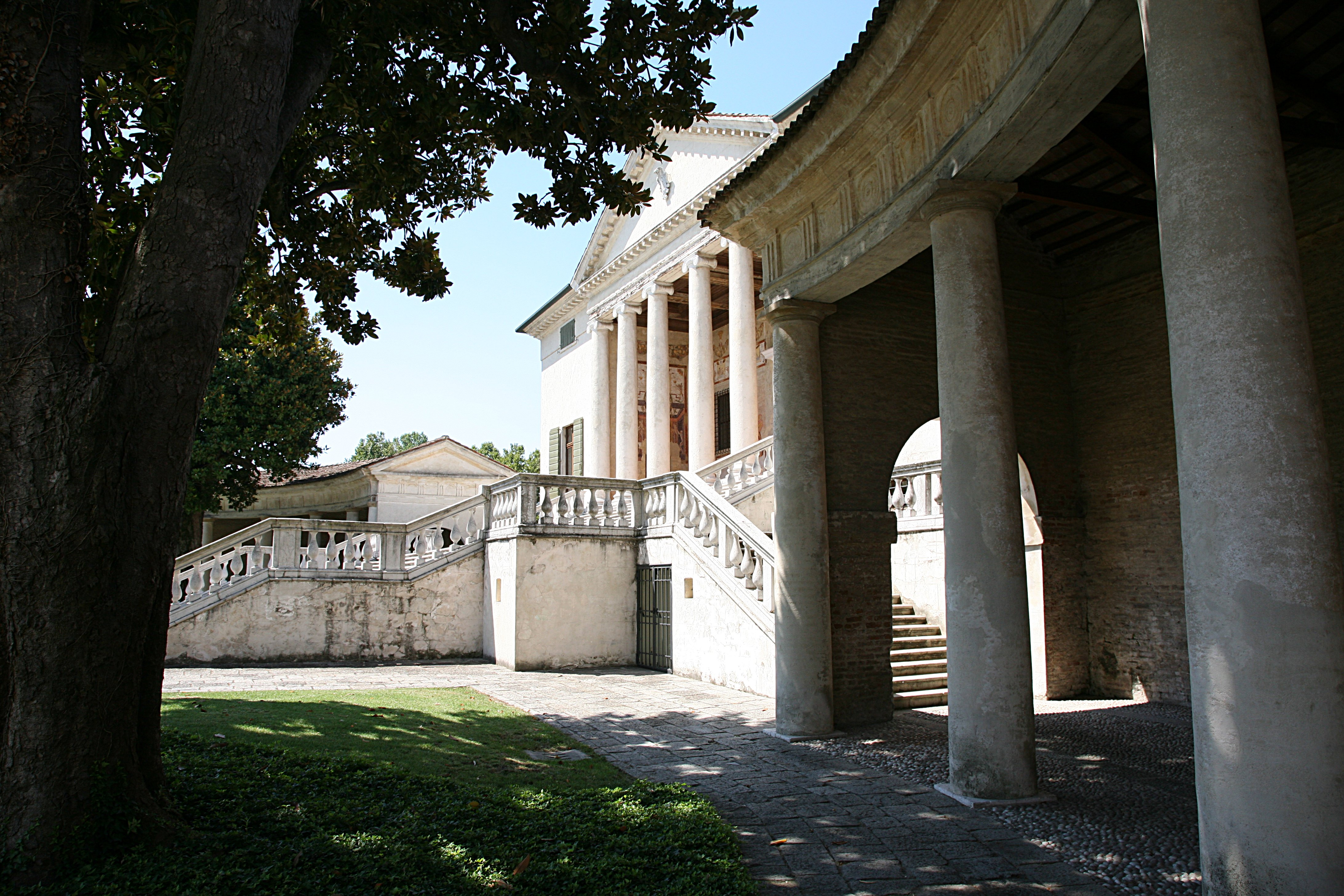
The main block from the curved colonnade

In 1554, on the southern border of the Venetian Republic’s territories, in the flat and foggy country of Polesine, Palladio designed a villa for the Venetian noble Francesco Badoer, intended to become the epicentre of the vast agricultural estate of almost five hundred fields that he had inherited six years previously.

Constructed and inhabited in 1556, the villa therefore functioned for the management of the fields and was simultaneously a visible sign of the “feudal” presence, so to speak, of Badoer in the territory: it is not coincidental that the building rises on the site of an ancient medieval castle. Palladio succeeded in uniting within one effective synthesis these dual meanings, joining the majestic manor house to the two barchesse (farm wings) bent into semicircles, which screen the stables and other agricultural annexes.

== The project by Palladio ==
There are no surviving drawings by Palladio relating to Villa Badoer, nor any building accounts, except those published by the architect in his I quattro libri dell'architettura (1570).

Probably as a result of exploiting the substructures of the medieval castle, the manor house of the villa rises on a high basement, and recalls precedents like the Villa Medici at Poggio a Caiano by Giuliano da Sangallo, and the not far distant Villa dei Vescovi at Luvigliano by Giovanni Maria Falconetto. Building on the old foundations saved money, and gave a slightly raised setting to the building. This manoeuvre rendered necessary a scenographic staircase of several flights leading to the front door of the villa, the main descending to the courtyard and the two lateral ones connecting with the gable-ends of the barchesse. Thus, the ensemble recalls the structures of an antique, terraced temple complex.

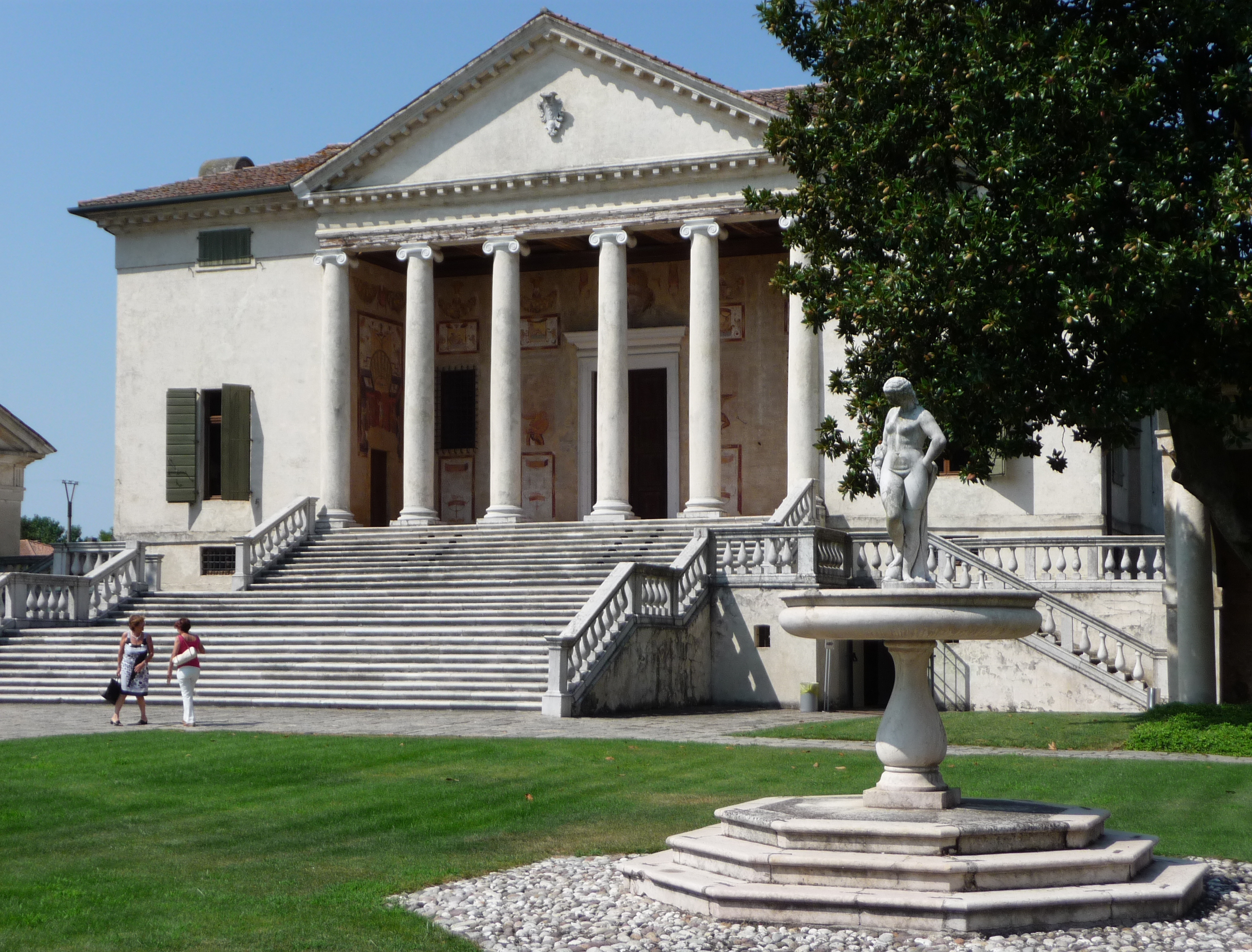
View from the entrance front

The elegant curvilinear barchesse are the only ones that were realised by Palladio from the many projected (for example, those for the Villa Mocenigo on the Brenta, the Villa Thiene at Cicogna or the Villa Trissino at Meledo) and their shape – as Palladio writes – recalls arms opening to receive the visitor; the relevant antique source was very probably the exedrae of the Temple of Augustus in Rome. These originally housed agricultural activities, for this was a working villa, like Villa Emo and most of the villas by Palladio. Unusual among Palladio's completed works, the wings here do not touch the villa, and they are set slightly in front of it. Vasari thought that they were beautiful, and even fantastic.

On the barchesse Palladio used the Tuscan order, appropriate to their utilitarian function and for the opportunity they afforded of realising very broad intercolumniations, which would not impede carriage access. Instead, the villa's loggia displays an elegant Ionic order, to emphasise its residential, manorial status. The visual focus of the entire complex was centred precisely on the dominant axis of the great triangular pediment supported by Ionic columns, which bears the family arms, such that the villa's flanks and rear are unarticulated and present a simply utilitarian aspect. This was the first time Palladio used his fully developed temple pediment in the façade of a villa.

Moreover, the distributive structure of the manorial house reveals Palladio's usual organisation into a vertical axis, with service rooms occupying the basement storey, the patron's habitation on the piano nobile, and a granary in the attic.

The plan and elevation of Villa Badoer presented in Palladio's woodcuts in the Quattro Libri of 1570 is somewhat different from what was built there. A rear elevation and portico shown in the book were never built, but whether interrupted and not resumed, or curtailed in the course of construction are not known. Puppi suggested "that the omission of the ceremonial features from the back façade had been decided by the patron, who must have thought them unnecessary in confrontation with the empty expanse of open countryside, and with the short extent of his property... on that side."

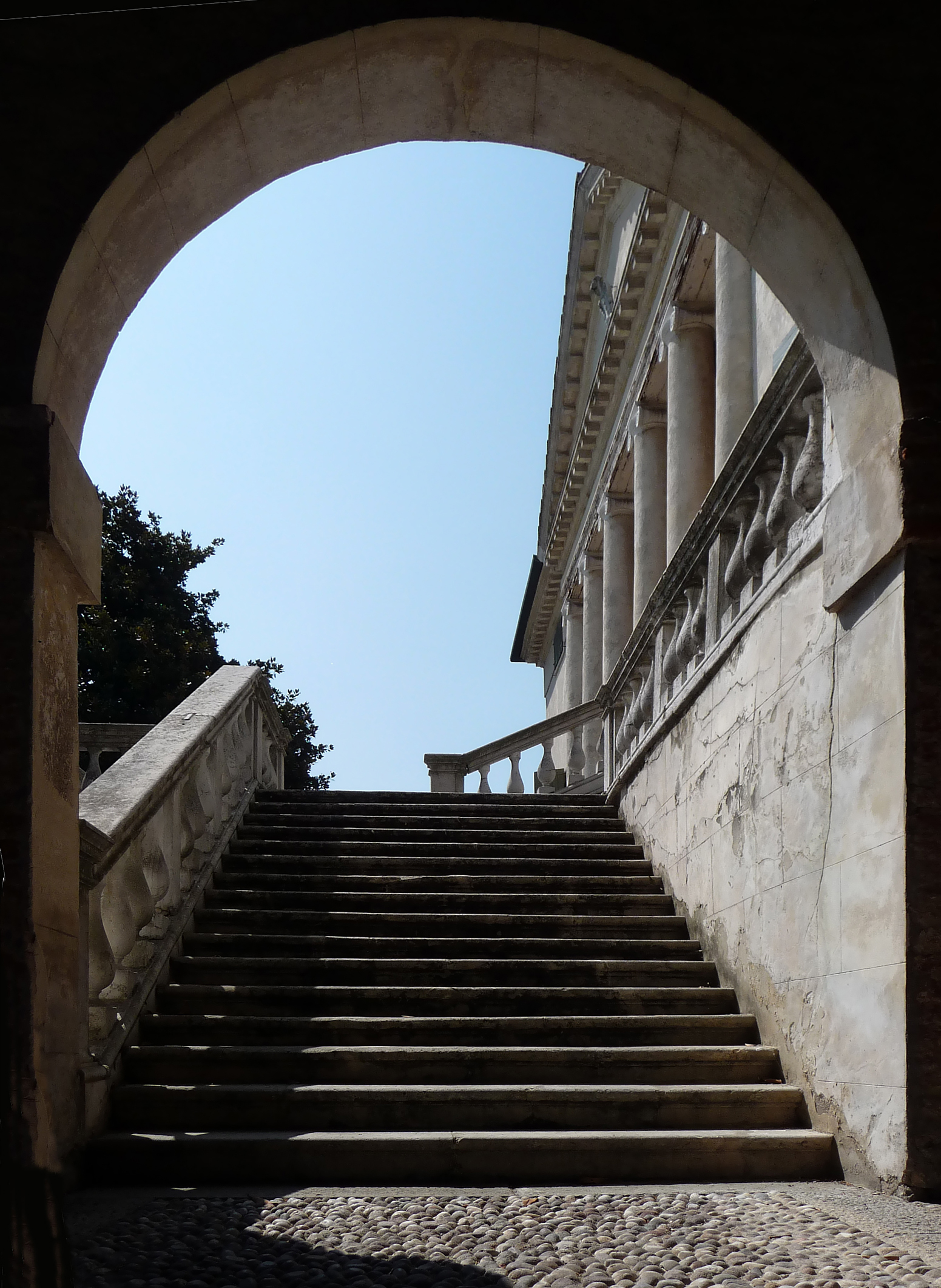
The pediment seen from a barchessa

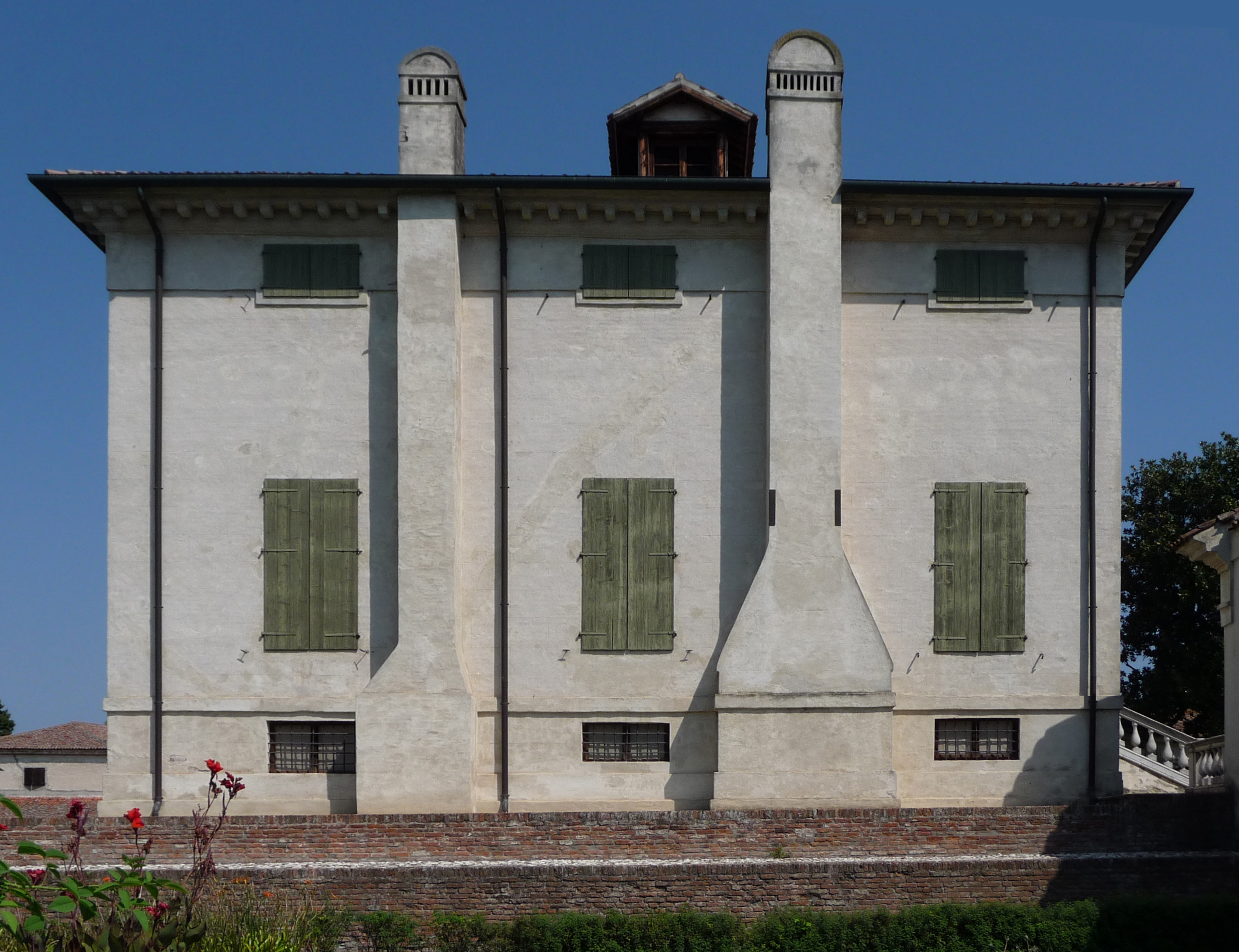
Side prospect

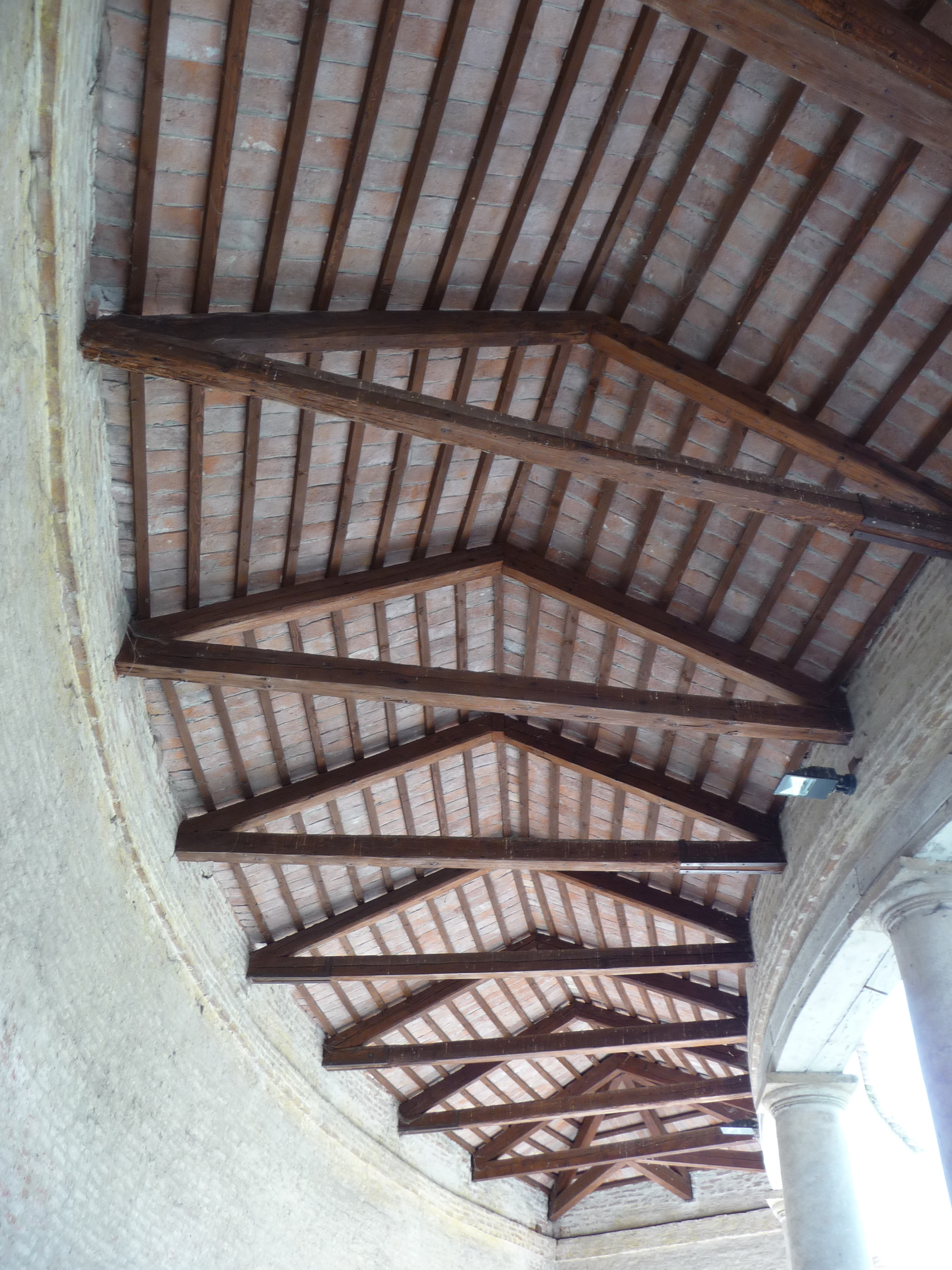
Structure of the roof of a curved barchessa

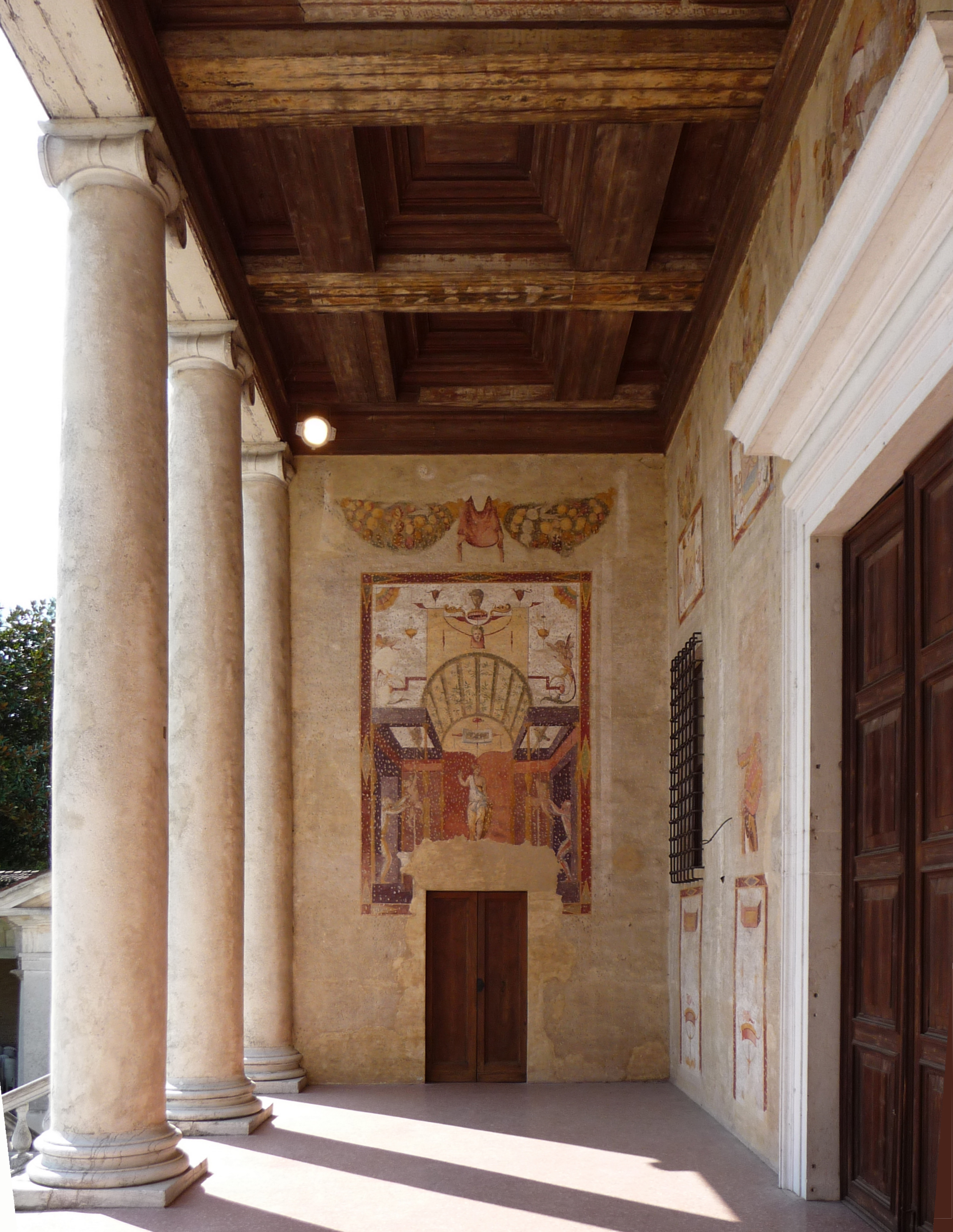
View inside the loggia

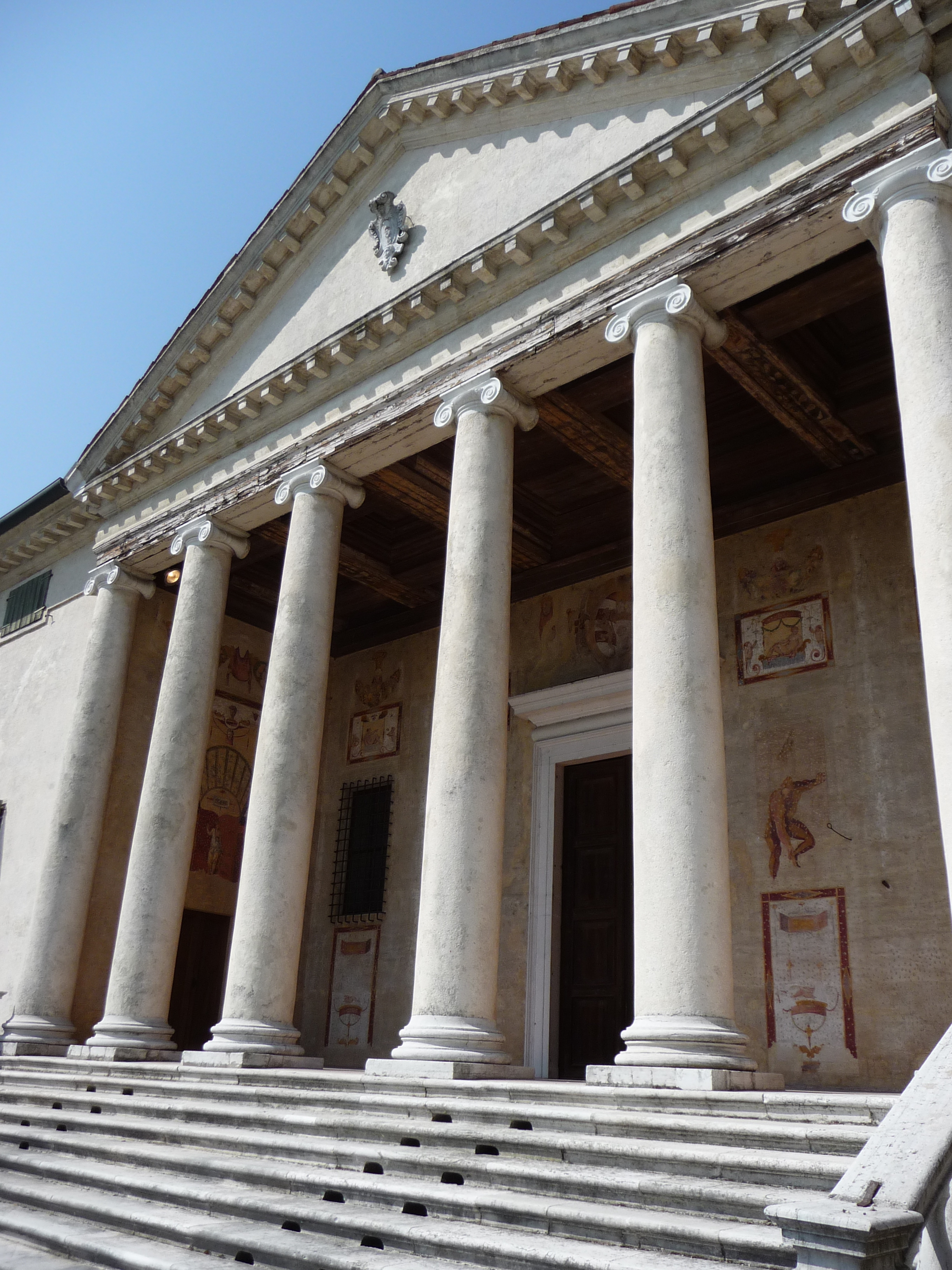
The pediment

== Interiors and decoration ==
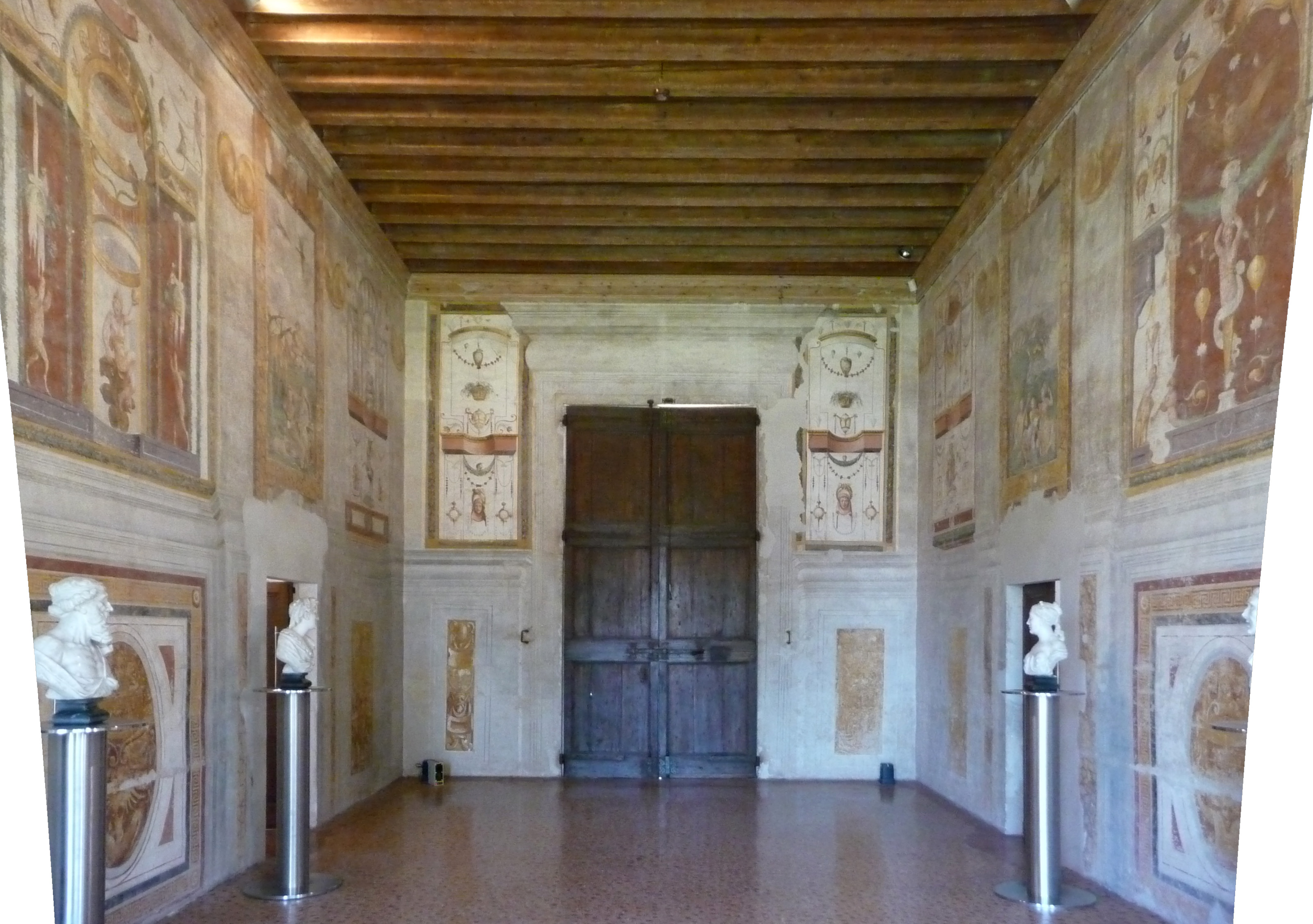
Main hall

The piano nobile retains its original fresco decoration. All the rooms are covered by flat ceilings and on the walls a certain "Giallo Fiorentino" designed complex combinations of allegorical figures, whose significance remains partially obscure. Palladio referred to these frescoes as being "grottesche di bellissima inventione" by a certain Giallo Fiorentino, whose real identity has remained uncertain. Milanesi's identification as Jacopo Giallo, a Florentine illuminator to whom some manuscript work has been assigned, was eliminated by Lionello Puppi's archival discovery that Jacopo Giallo was dead by 1545, thirteen years before the villa was built; Puppi offered instead a certain fresco painter "Giallo Fiorentino", an assistant to Giuseppe Salviati for exterior frescoes at Palazzo Loredan at San Stefano. More recently, Pier Francesco di Jacopo Foschi has been suggested.

Architectural critics such as Witold Rybczynski think that the interior is relatively small and unimpressive, compared to the grandiose exterior.

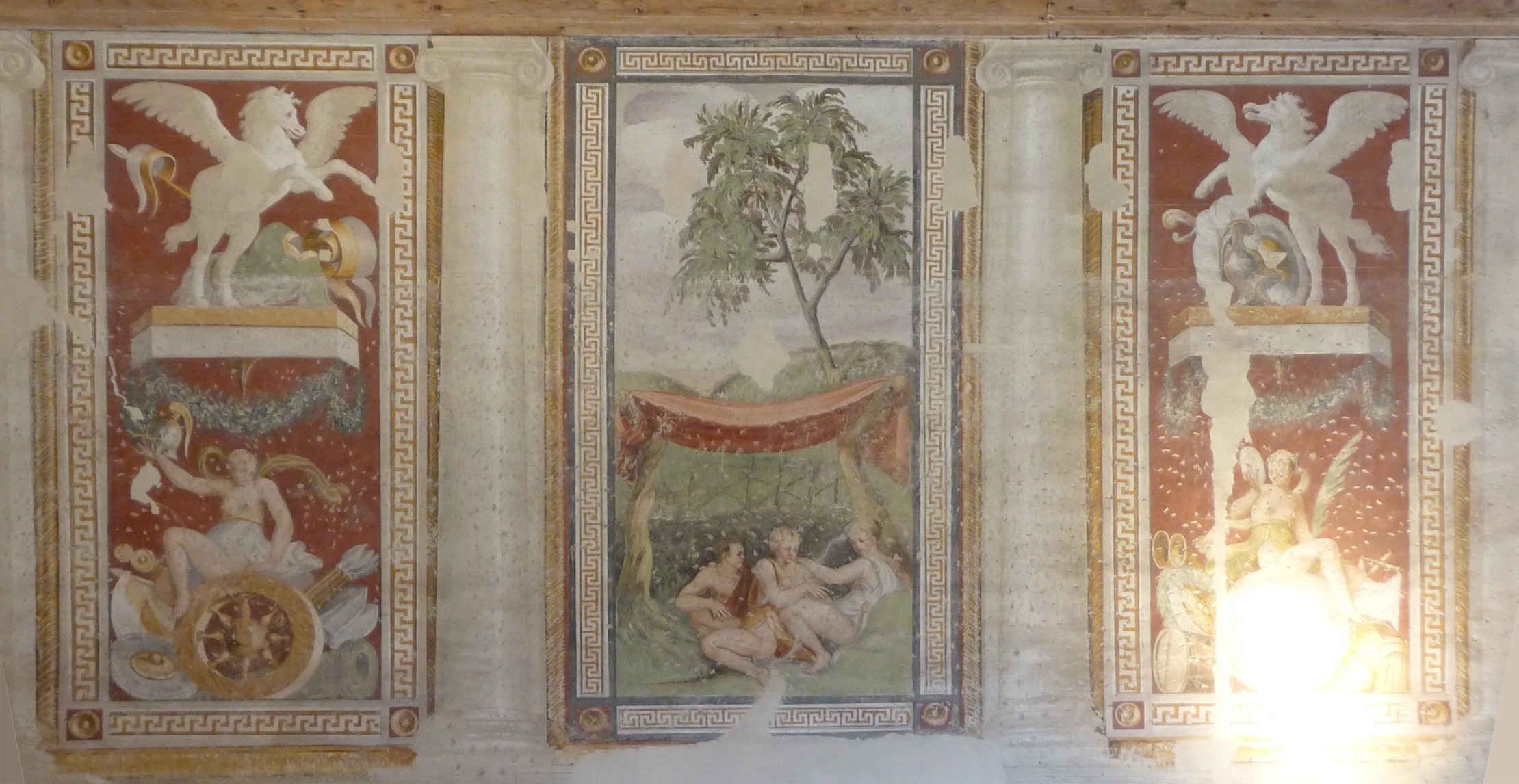
Fresco by Giallo Fiorentino

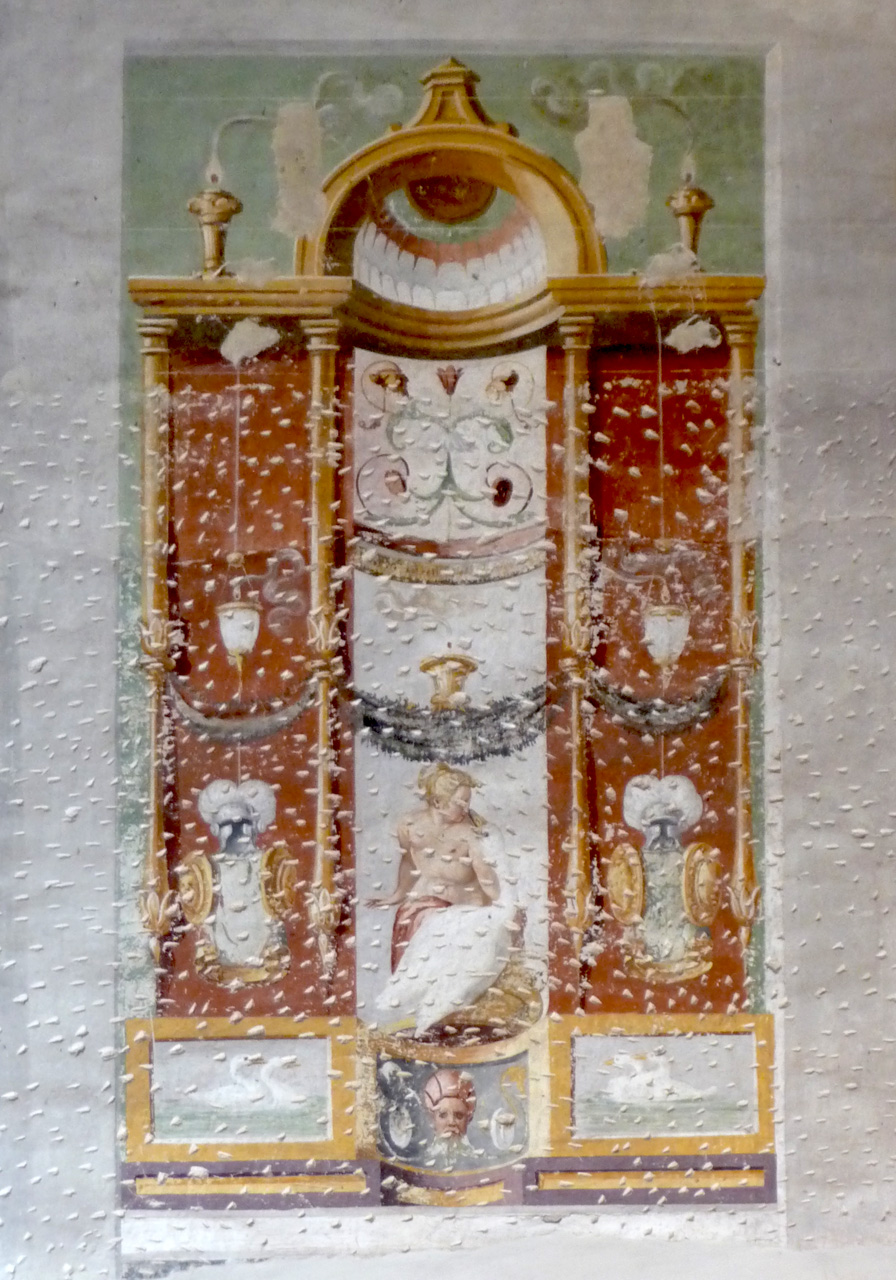
Grotesque

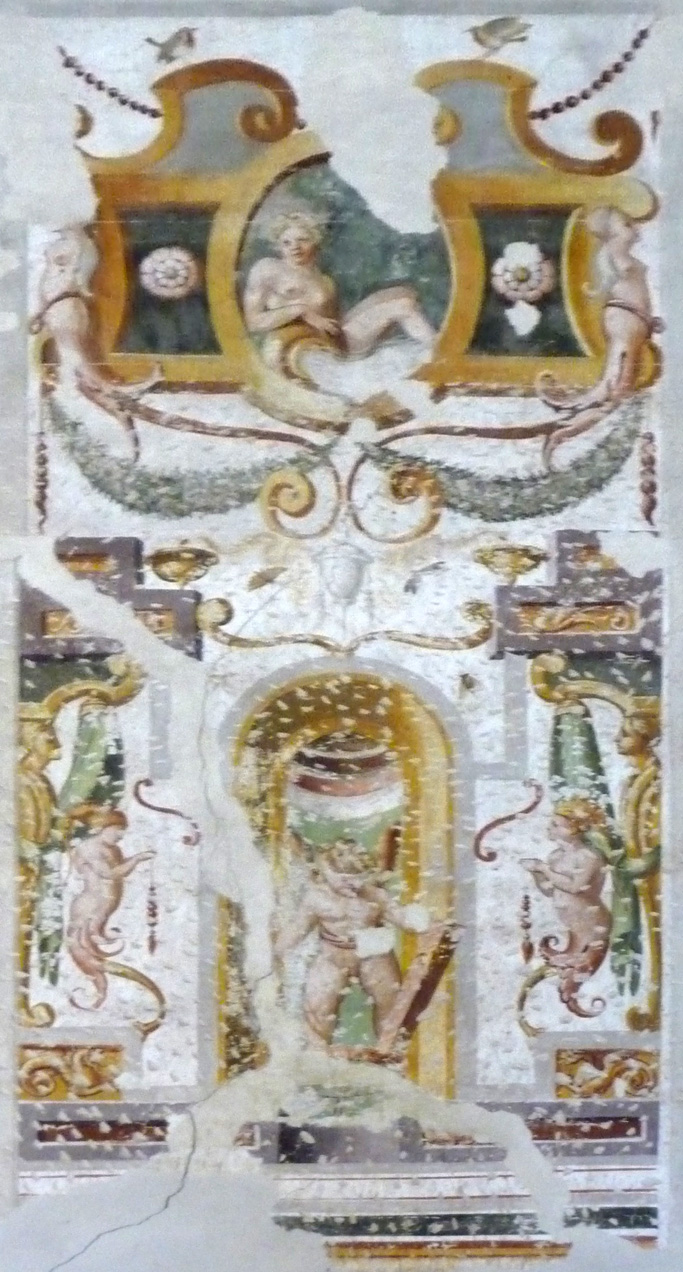
Grotesque

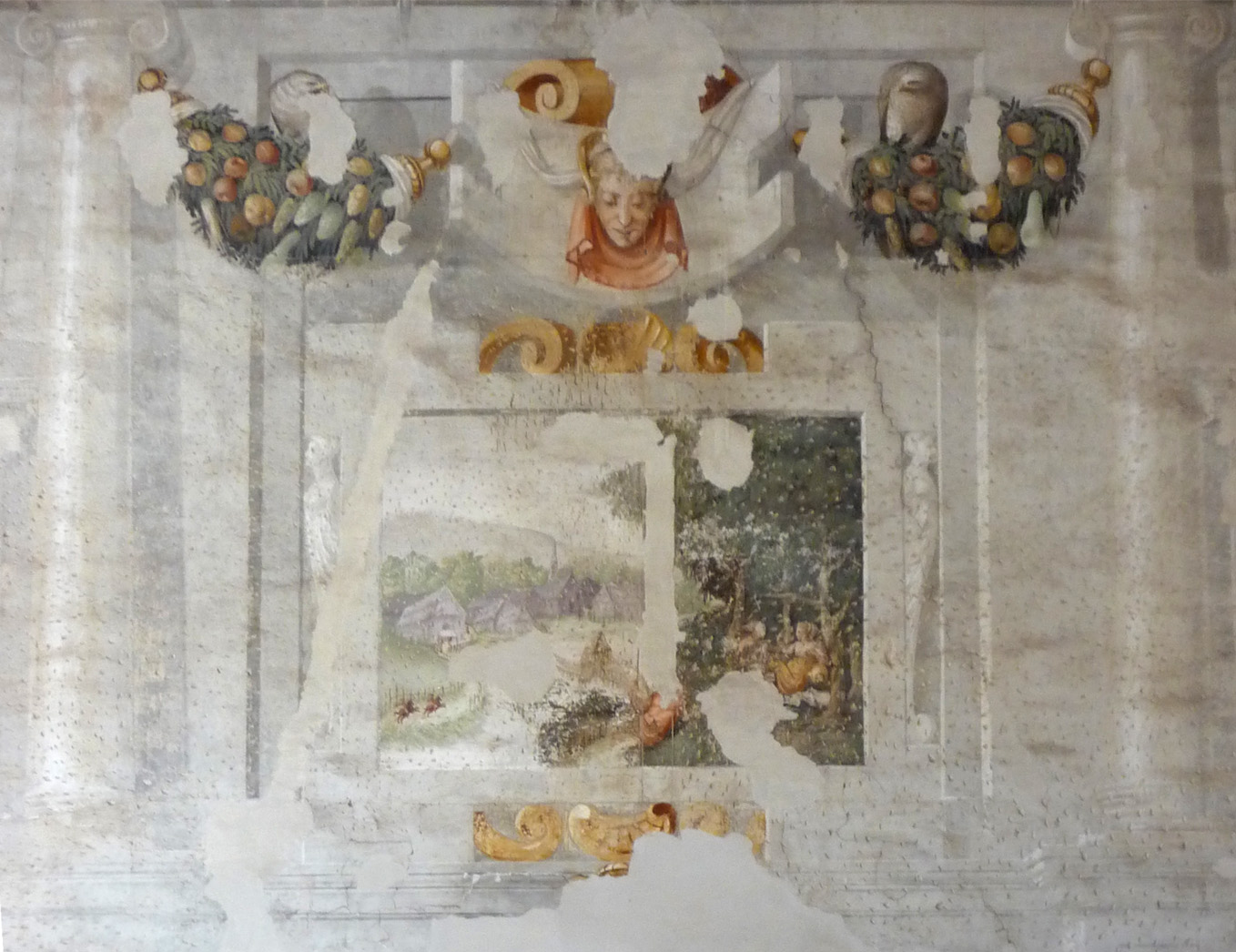
Fresco by Giallo Fiorentino

== Conservation ==
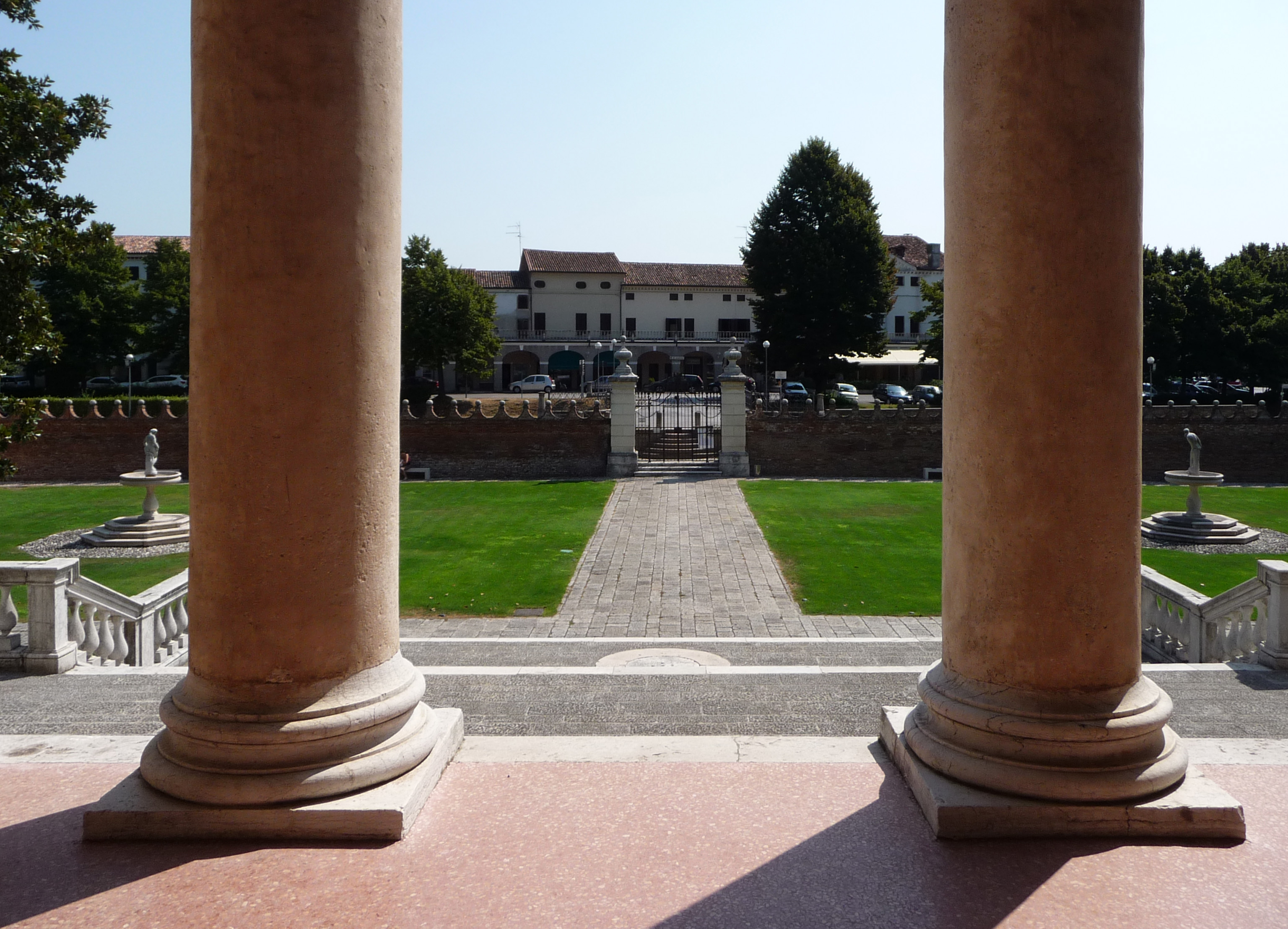
The town of Fratta Polesine seen from the loggia of Villa Badoer

The building passed to the public in the 1960s (initially to the Ville Venete Institute, then to the Province of Rovigo) and was completely restored.

In 1996, UNESCO designated Villa Badoer as part of the World Heritage Site "City of Vicenza and the Palladian Villas of the Veneto".

The building is open to the public. Since 21 February 2009 the northern barchesse of the Villa houses the Museo archeologico nazionale di Fratta Polesine (National archaeological museum of Fratta Polesine).

== See also ==
- Palladian Villas of the Veneto
- Palladian architecture
