= Scuola di Rialto =

Former public school in Venice

The Scuola di Rialto was a public school in Venice founded between 1397 and 1408, through a bequest of Tommaso Talenti. It did not confer degrees, so as not to compete with the University of Padua, the only degree-granting institution in the Republic of Venice. It had a single professor, almost always a patrician, who lectured on terminist logic and Aristotelian natural philosophy. The salary was 200 ducats and the professor was usually chosen by the Senate through open competition. Although Greek was not taught, its knowledge by the professor was valued.

The fourth professor was, unusually, a clergyman, Paolo della Pergola, who held the chair from 1421 until 1455. The republic quashed his attempt to convert the school into a university in 1445. He was succeeded by Domenico Bragadin (1455–1482), the first chosen by competition. The longest serving professor was Sebastian Foscarin, who held the chair from 1505 to 1552. Foscarin had several substitutes over his long career, since he often held public office. One of these substitutes was the future Doge Nicolò da Ponte.
