= Maurice Coxhead =

English cricketer

Maurice Edward Coxhead (24 May 1889 – 3 May 1917) was an English first-class cricketer active who played for Middlesex. He was born in Kensington and educated at Eastbourne College and Brasenose College, Oxford. He was killed near Monchy, France, on active service in the Royal Fusiliers during World War I.
