= Marco Badoer =

Marco Badoer da Santa Giustina (died 1288) was a Venetian administrator, diplomat and military commander.

Marco was born in the early years of the 13th century. His father, Marino, was a procurator of Saint Mark from 1223. He married Marchesina, daughter of Doge Pietro Ziani (r. 1205–1229) and his second wife, Constance, daughter of King Tancred of Sicily. They had several children: Marino, Marco (called del Sestrier di San Marco to distinguish him from his father), Ruggero, Giovanni, Badoaro, Andrea, Sibilla and Maria.

In 1256, Pope Alexander IV declared a crusade against the tyrant Ezzelino III da Romano and formed a league with Venice. The papal legate named Marco marshal and podestà of the army of the league, while Tommaso Giustiniani da San Pantalon was named governor and Azzo VII d'Este captain-general. On 20 June, Marco occupied the city of Padua, where he arranged the marriage of his eldest son with Balzanella, heiress of the Da Peraga. Following Ezzelino's death in October 1259, he occupied Treviso, where he served as podestà from 19 October 1259 until 6 August 1260. He governed with the counsel of ten consuls and twelve elders. He declared void all sales of property made in the previous fifteen years and on 16 March 1260 confiscated all the property of Ezzelino and his brother Alberico. He harnessed the resources of Treviso for the final phase of the war. He then besieged Alberico da Romano in San Zenone until he surrendered on 23 August.

In 1261, Marco was one of the electors of the Maggior Consiglio. That year he was a member of the embassy sent to congratulate Pope Urban IV on his election and ask for papal assistance in recovering for the Latin Empire the city of Constantinople, recently lost to the Byzantines. The future doge Jacopo Contarini was also on this mission.

In 1270, when Venice went to war with Bologna for the right to navigate the Po, Marco commanded a flotilla of nine galleys on the Po di Primaro. After two months, he turned command over to Jacopo Dondulo. In 1275, he was one of the rectors of the Dogeship between the death of Lorenzo Tiepolo and the election of Jacopo Contarini. In 1278, he drew up his will, requesting burial in Santa Maria Gloriosa dei Frari. That year, he was sent with Andrea Zeno and Guiberto Dandolo to congratulate Pope Nicholas III on his election, but the pope refused to receive them because of Venice's war with Ancona.

In 1281, Marco was on the Minor Council. In 1282, he was podestà of Chioggia. His date of death is unrecorded, but was probably in 1288. His children are recorded executing his will that year.

== Bibliography ==
- Bastianelli, Lucia (1963). "Badoer, Marco, detto di Santa Giustina". Dizionario Biografico degli Italiani, Volume 5: Bacca–Baratta (in Italian). Rome: Istituto dell'Enciclopedia Italiana. ISBN 978-8-81200032-6.
- Hazlitt, W. C. (1858). The History of the Origin and Rise of the Republic of Venice. Vol. 2. London.
- Pryor, John H. (1999). "The Maritime Republics". In David Abulafia (ed.). The New Cambridge Medieval History. Vol. 5, c.1198 – c.1300. Cambridge University Press. pp. 419–447.
