= Andrea Badoer =

Andrea Badoer (1447–1525) served as ambassador of the Republic of Venice to the Court of Henry VIII of England from 1509 to 1515. His dispatches are today read in the Calendar of State Papers, Venice.
