= Fratta Polesine =

- Comune
- Comune di Fratta Polesine
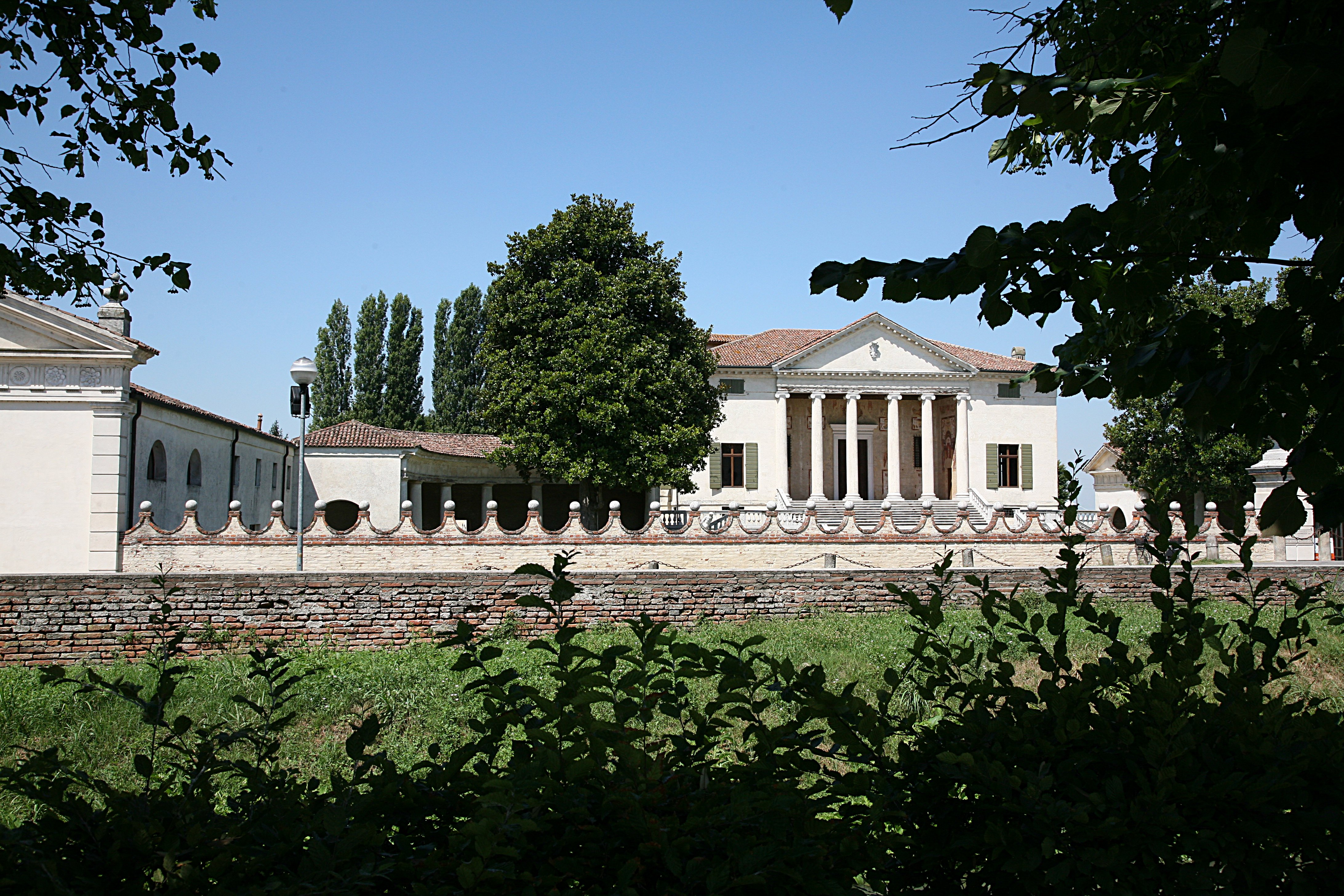
- Palladio's Villa Badoer

- Coat of arms

- Location within Italy Location within Veneto
- Coordinates: 45°2′N 11°39′E
- Country: Italy
- Region: Veneto
- Province: Rovigo (RO)
- Frazioni: Paolino, Ramedello

Government
  - Mayor: Giuseppe Tasso

Area
  - Total: 20.9 km^{2} (8.1 sq mi)
- Elevation: 11 m (36 ft)

Population (31 August 2017)
  - Total: 2,637
  - Density: 126/km^{2} (327/sq mi)
- Demonym: Frattensi
- Time zone: UTC+1 (CET)
  - Summer (DST): UTC+2 (CEST)
- Postal code: 45025
- Dialing code: 0425
- Patron saint: Sts. Peter and Paul
- Saint day: 29 June
- Website: Official website

Fratta Polesine (Venetian: Frata Połèzine) is a comune (municipality) in the Province of Rovigo in the Italian region Veneto, located about 70 kilometres (43 mi) southwest of Venice and about 11 kilometres (7 mi) southwest of Rovigo. Its main attraction is Andrea Palladio's Villa Badoer.

Fratta Polesine is the birthplace of the Italian socialist politician Giacomo Matteotti, opponent of Fascism.

== Twin towns ==
- Tulcea, Romania
- Conversano, Italy
- Trecenta, Italy
- Recanati, Italy
- Palazzolo Acreide, Italy

== See also ==
- Frattesina
