= Michael Coxhead =

British businessman, entrepreneur and musician

- Born: Michael Peter Coxhead
- Occupations: Businessman, entrepreneur

Michael Peter Coxhead is a British businessman, entrepreneur and musician. Coxhead is the founder of MPC Electronics Ltd.

== Early career ==
Coxhead is best known as the founder of MPC Electronics Ltd. The company was formed when Clive Button came up with the basic design for an electronic drum machine at the beginning of the 80's. 'The Kit' prototype was designed within a year and won 'Product of the show' award on taking it over to the NAMM Convention in Atlanta. With MXR taking on the USA distribution and promotion and Atlantex in the UK, things began to take off quickly for Coxhead. The British born company, based in Willingham, Cambridgeshire, wound up in 1986. Rival companies from the time, such as Akai, went on to develop the ideas of MPC Electronics and make the drum pads available to individuals all over the world.

== Recent years ==
Michael held directorships with a number of companies throughout the 1980s and 1990s, ranging from the building and property industries, to gift sales and the music industry, including MPC Property Company, Norfolk and Suffolk Property Company, Preston Construction Ltd, National Electrical and Mechanical Testing Ltd, Fast Forward Productions Ltd, Woodcox Trading Ltd. and Musicians Preferred Choice. Throughout the 1990s and the 2000s, Coxhead worked for Funtime Gifts Ltd. He is currently retired in Suffolk, near Bury St. Edmunds.
