= Riformatori dello studio di Padova =

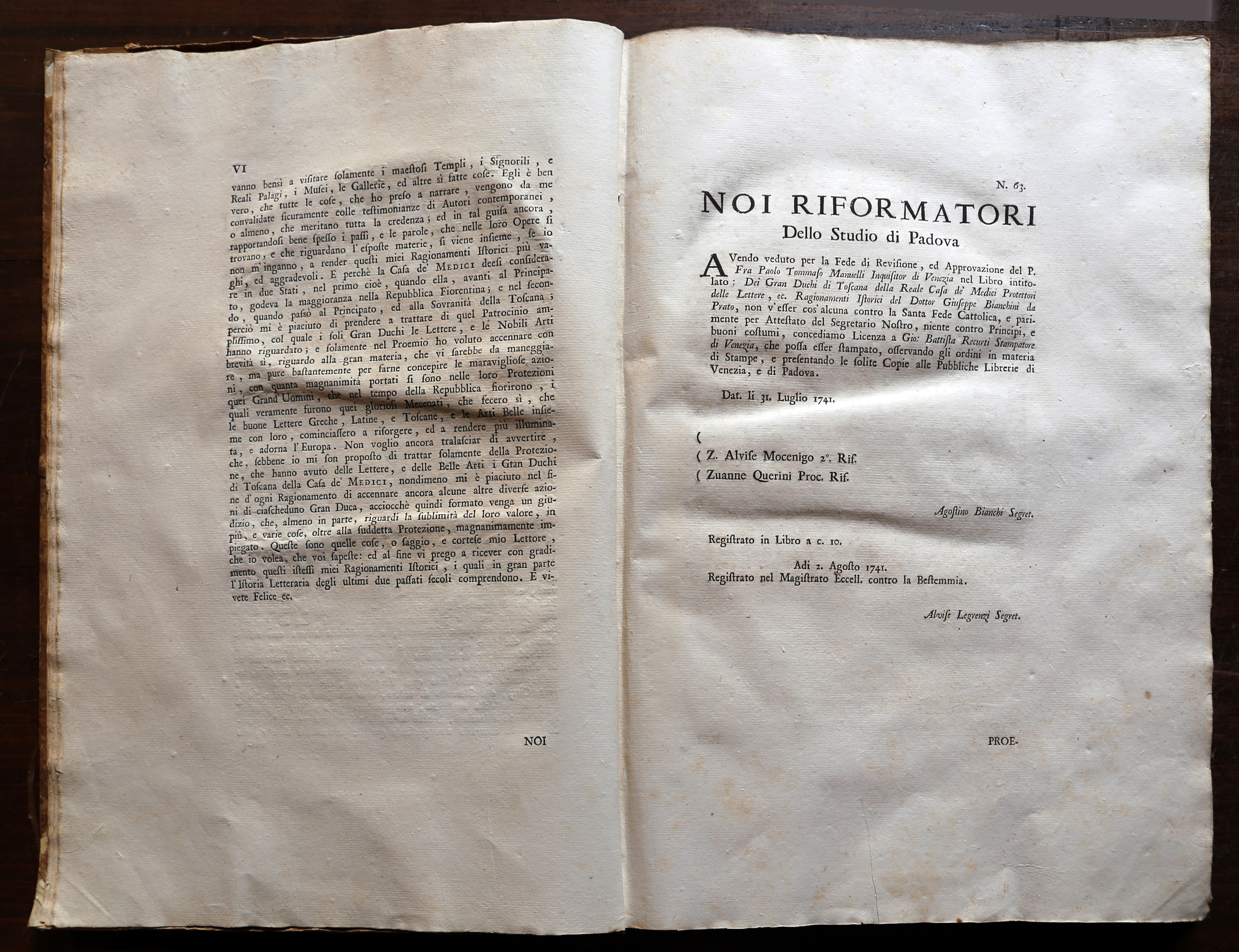
Imprimatur of the Riformatori dello studio di Padova, authorizing the publication of Dei Granduchi di Toscana della real Casa De' Medici in 1741

The Riformatori dello studio di Padova, also Riformatori allo studio di Padova, (English: Reformers of the University of Padua) were the three officials of the Venetian Republic responsible for overseeing education and culture. Created in 1517, initially to reopen the University of Padua after the War of the League of Cambrai, they became responsible over time for public and private schooling at all levels, public libraries in Venice and Padua, intellectual academies, and professional schools. They also reviewed and authorized for publication all books within the mainland territory of Venice.

== Origins ==
The University of Padua, founded in 1222, came under the jurisdiction of Venice when Padua was annexed to the Venetian Republic in 1405. Administration of the university, previously exercised by the nationes, relatively autonomous groups of students organized according to national origins, fell increasingly to the rettore, a Venetian nobleman nominated by the government to administer the city of Padua as a part of the mainland territories of the Republic.

Classes were suspended in 1509 and the teachers and students dispersed as a result of the War of the League of Cambrai when Padua was briefly conquered by the troops of the Holy Roman Empire before being retaken by Venice. On 21 February 1517 (Venetian year 1516), the Venetian Senate tasked the Full College, the executive organ of the Republic, with reopening the University of Padua. This involved repairing physical damage to the buildings, hiring new professors, and organizing courses. For this purpose, three nobles were chosen with the title of riformatori dello studio di Padova. Successive legislation on 22 September and 17 October 1528 established the riformatori as a permanent committee of the Senate, responsible for education matters.

== Election ==
From 1517 until 1527, the nomination of the riformatori was delegated to the Consulta dei Savi del Collegio, composed of the Savi Grandi, the Savi di Terraferma, and the Savi agli Ordini. When the office was made permanent in 1528, the riformatori were designated as a magistratura senatoriale (senatorial magistracy), a standing subcommittee of the Senate. They were henceforth elected by the Senate from among its own members.

In 1553, a deliberation of the Senate divided the senatorial magistracies between aperte (open) and serrate (closed); members of the latter could not be elected to an alternative office prior to the completion of their term. The objective was to ensure that magistrates dealing with more complex or critical matters had sufficient time to gain practical experience. Although the riformatori dello studio di Padova were initially designated as a closed magistracy, beginning in 1625 they were no longer required to serve the entire term of office if they were elected to an alternative closed magistracy. Laws in 1648 and 1674 designated the riformatori as sopranumerari (supernumerary), allowing the office to be held simultaneously with a closed magistracy. Ultimately, the law of 22 April 1731 established the riformatori as a magistratura privilegiata (privileged magistracy): the office was compatible with any other magistracy and could be held together with one closed magistracy and, at the same time, with one or more open or supernumerary magistracies.

== Functions ==
The role of the riformatori was progressively expanded beyond the original task of reopening the university, up to and including the right to preside over the university, effectively replacing the Venetian rector of Padua in his supervisory functions. The riformatori determined the number of official chairs for professors and of lectureships for teachers, hired professors and lectors, and fixed salaries. They determined teaching methods, authorized texts for readings, established the hours of classes, and prevented university professors from teaching privately. Although they were initially advised by the consiliarii, elected by the nationes of students, all decisions regarding the faculty and the curriculum were assigned directly to the riformatori in 1560 when the elected offices within the university were abolished.

With the exception of religious seminaries and the military college of Verona, all private and public schools within the territory of the Republic of Venice came under their jurisdiction, as did all scientific, literary, and artistic academies. They were additionally responsible for censorship which involved reviewing and authorizing all books for publication and preventing the importation of forbidden works.

In 1544 the riformatori were also charged with overseeing the Public Library of Saint Mark in Venice. The election of the librarian was delegated by the Senate to the riformatori in 1558, but in 1626 the responsibility was attributed once again to the whole Senate. With regard to the official state historian, the riformatori were required to review his progress every two years and present their findings to the three chiefs of the Council of Ten who were ultimately responsible for determining the suitability of the writings.

== Authority ==
As a senatorial magistracy, the riformatori dello studio di Padova had the right to propose legislation in the Senate concerning those matters that fell under their purview. But they did not have authority to independently judge cases involving the transgression of the laws and norms that regulated educational matters and academic life. Such cases were raised by the riformatori to the Council of Ten which had jurisdiction.

== Bibliography ==
- Besta, Enrico, Il senato veneziano: origine, costituzione, attribuzioni e riti (Venezia: Regia deputazione veneta di storia patria, 1899)
- Cappelletti, Giuseppe, Relazione storica sulle magistrature venete (Venezia: Filippi Editore, 1873)
- Da Mosto, Andrea, L'Archivio di Stato di Venezia, indice generale, storico, descrittivo ed analitico (Roma: Biblioteca d'Arte editrice, 1937)
- Milan, Catia, Antonio Politi, and Bruno Vianello, Guida alle magistrature: elementi per la conoscenza della Repubblica veneta (Sommacampagna: Cierre, 2003) ISBN 8883142047
- Tiepolo, Maria Francesca, 'Venezia', in La Guida generale degli Archivi di Stato, IV (Roma: Ministero per i beni culturali e ambientali, Ufficio centrale per i beni archivistici, 1994), pp. 857–1014, 1062–1070, 1076–1140 ISBN 9788871250809
- Zorzi, Marino, La libreria di san Marco: libri, lettori, società nella Venezia dei dogi (Milano: Mondadori, 1987) ISBN 8804306866
