= Francesco Badoer (1507–1564) =

16th Century Venetian politician

Francesco Badoer (20 June 1507 – 19 October 1564) was a Venetian patrician, politician and diplomat.

Badoer was the son of Giovanni Badoer and Marietta Marcello. He was born at Salò while his father was serving as provveditore there. He was elected savio agli ordini in 1533 and 1534. In 1535, he joined the Council of Forty. In 1538, in order to fund the war with Turkey, certain rich noblemen were offered seats in the Senate in return for a sum of money. Badoer bought his way into the Senate at this time, but the unpopularity of the measure meant that he did not use his senatorial title until he was elected in the normal way in 1550.

In 1541–1542, Badoer was captain of Vicenza. On 24 May 1547, he was elected ambassador to the court of King Ferdinand I of Germany, while Alvise Mocenigo was elected ambassador to the Emperor Charles V. He arrived at the Diet of Augsburg on 4 April 1548. He reported on the diet and then followed Ferdinand to Vienna in June. He returned to Venice in 1550. He was succeeded by Federico Badoer.

In 1552–1553, 1555, 1558 and 1560–1562, Badoer served as a savio di Terraferma. In 1554, he was one of the riformatori of the University of Padua. In 1555, he was also sopra atti del Sopragastaldo. In May 1561, he was elected ambassador to Philip II of Spain, but declined.

== Bibliography ==
- Ventura, Angelo (1963). "Badoer, Francesco". Dizionario Biografico degli Italiani, Volume 5: Bacca–Baratta (in Italian). Rome: Istituto dell'Enciclopedia Italiana. ISBN 978-8-81200032-6.
- Turba, Gustav, ed. (1892). Venetianische Depeschen vom Kaiserhofe. Vol. 2. Vienna.
