= Paolo Paruta =

Italian historian (1540–1598)

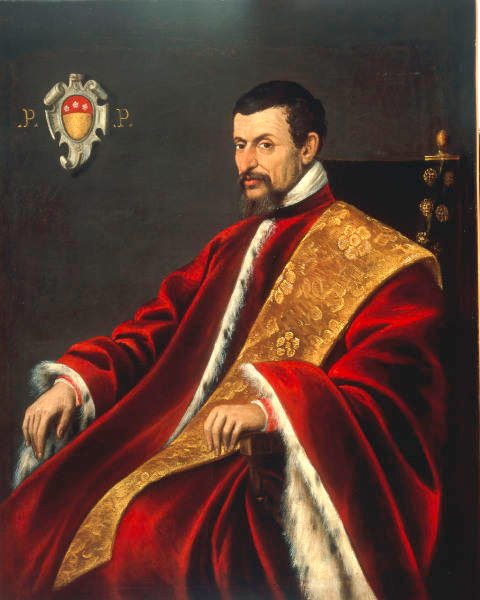
Portrait of Paolo Paruta, by Domenico Tintoretto.

Paolo Paruta (14 May 1540 – 6 December 1598) was a Venetian historian and statesman.

== Biography ==
He was born at Venice of a Luccan family. After studying at Padua he served the Republic of Venice in various political capacities, including that of secretary to one of the Venetian delegates at the Council of Ten.

In 1562 he accompanied the ambassador Michele Suriano to the Court of Emperor Maximilian II and acted as official historiographer of the Republic; during which office he delivered the funeral oration for those killed at the naval battle of Lepanto (1571). After the change of government he was made savio di Terraferma (minister for the administration of the Terraferma), and became a senator.

In 1579 he was appointed official historian to the republic, in succession to Luigi Contarini. He took up the narrative from where Cardinal Bembo had left it, in 1513, and brought it down to 1551. He was made provveditore to the Chamber of Loans in 1580, Commisario del Cadore (1589), savio del consiglio in 1590, ambassador to the pope in Rome (1592–95) and governor of Brescia (1590–92). In 1596 he was appointed procurator of St Mark's (1596, next in dignity to the doge), and provveditore delle fortezze (superintendent of fortifications) in 1597. He died in Venice.

== Writings ==
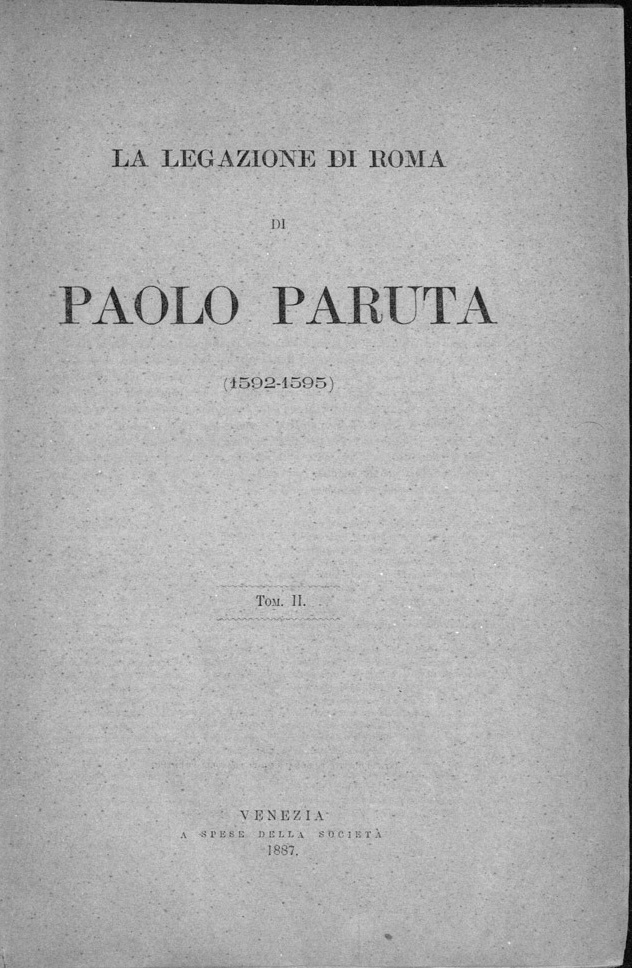
La legazione di Roma di Paolo Paruta, ed. Giuseppe De Leva, vol. II, 1887

He was devoted from youth to literature and philosophy, also the composition of poetry. He applied himself especially to history and political science, and was at the end of the sixteenth century what Machiavelli, though in a different way, was at the beginning. He belonged intellectually to the group of recently ennobled men who met at the residence of the Morosini to discuss politics, which party (it may be called the liberal party) came into authority in 1582.

His chief works are the Guerra di Cipro ("War of Cyprus") and the Storia Veneziana, a continuation of Bembo's history, embracing the years 1513 to 1551, which was at first written in Latin and subsequently in Italian, published until posthumously in 1599. Both works were composed at the request of the Government, but written with truth and impartiality, showing especially the connection between the current events of Venice and the general history of Europe.

His Despatches from Rome and the Relazione written at the end of his diplomatic mission reveal his great political foresight, by his accurate estimate of men and affairs at Rome, and which are equal to those of the greatest Venetian ambassadors.

Of his political writings, the Della perfezione della vita politica in dialogue form, written between 1572 and 1579, of somewhat didactic and academic tone, treats principally of the superiority of the active and contemplative life, a problem he decides in favour of the active life on account of its contributing more to the welfare of the Republic. It was supposed, not without reason, to have been written to controvert the ideas contained in Bellarmine's De officio principis christiani.

His Discorsi politici were not published until after his death. The first book treats of the greatness and decadence of the Romans; the second of modern governments, especially Venice, being really an apology for the latter's policy. Among his other works may be mentioned a number of political orations.

Though Paruta is an independent thinker, Machiavelli's influence is notable. The policy of Italian equilibrium, which a century later developed into that of European equilibrium, was clearly foreseen by him. In his political views economy is not an important part, and therein he is inferior to his contemporary, the Piedmontese Botero.

== Bibliography ==
- Benzoni, Gino (2014). "PARUTA, Paolo". Dizionario Biografico degli Italiani (in Italian). Vol. 81: Pansini–Pazienza. Rome: Istituto dell'Enciclopedia Italiana. ISBN 978-88-12-00032-6.
- Apostolo Zeno's edition of Paruta's history (in the series Degli Istorici delle cose veneziane, Venice, 1718)
- Cirillo Monzani's edition of Paruta's political works (Florence, 1852)
