= Agostino Valier =

17th-century Catholic cardinal

His Eminence Agostino Valier
- Cardinal-Bishop of Palestrina; Bishop of Verona
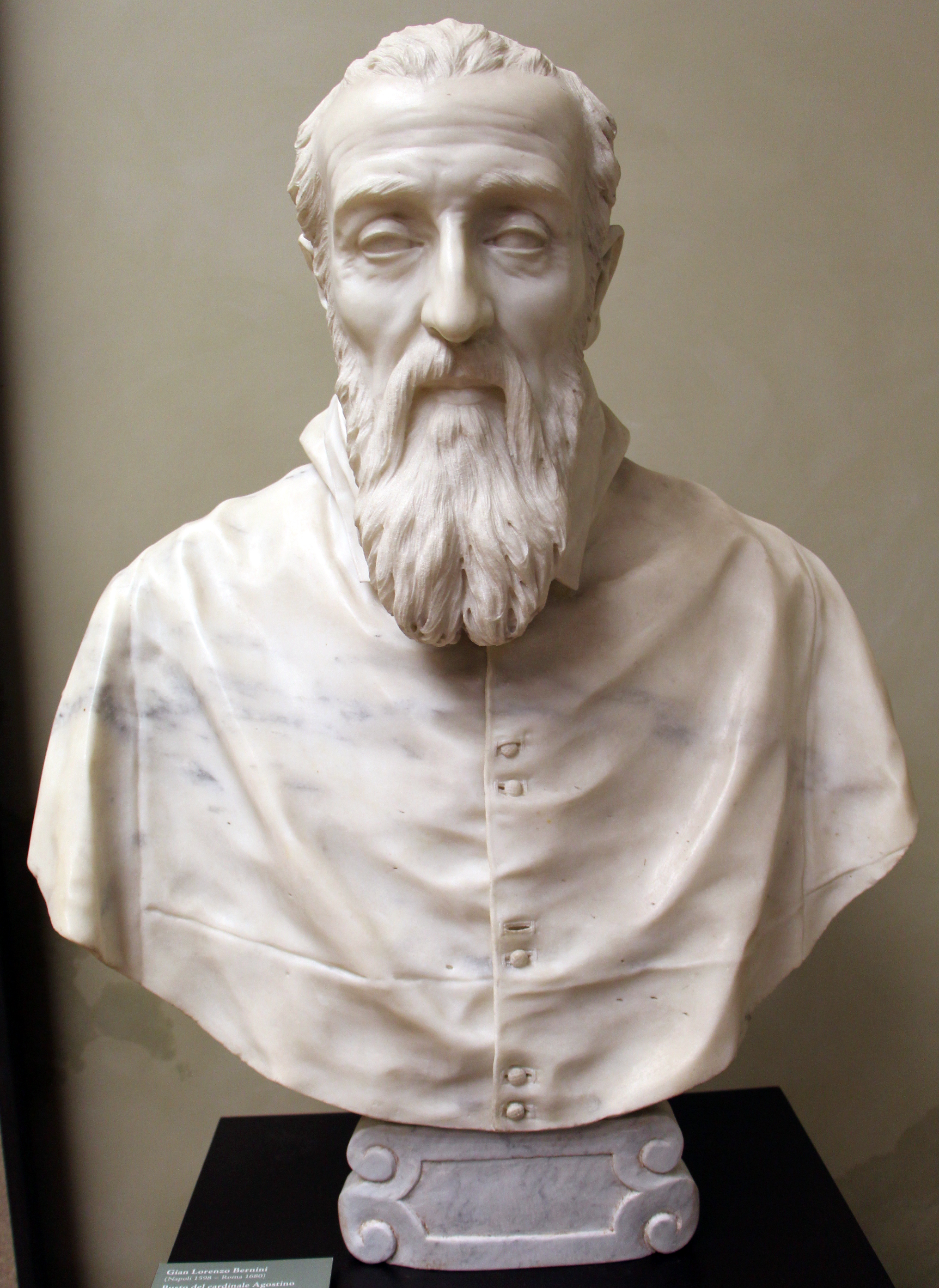
- Bust of Valier by Gian Lorenzo Bernini
- Church: Catholic Church

Personal details
- Born: 7 April 1531 Venice, Italy
- Died: 24 May 1606 (age 75) Rome, Italy

Agostino Valier (7 April 1531 – 24 May 1606), also Augustinus Valerius or Valerio, was an Italian cardinal and bishop of Verona. He was a reforming bishop, putting into effect the decisions of the Council of Trent by means of administrative and disciplinary measures. He was one of the Christian humanist followers of Filippo Neri.

== Life ==
He was born in Venice on 7 April 1531. He became a doctor of canon law.

Valier took part in the intellectual life of his time. In Venice, around the year 1560, he was associated with the Academy of Fame of Federico Badoer; he later also took part in the Noctes Vaticanae. As a dedicatee of one of the works of Jacopo Zabarella he may have been a patron.

Agostino was the nephew of Cardinal Bernardo Navagero (1507 – 1565), and assumed his position as bishop when his uncle died. Valier as bishop from 1565 was influenced by his reforming predecessor at Verona, Gian Matteo Giberti, as well as the Council of Trent, and his association with Carlo Borromeo. He followed Borromeo's Milan model but not slavishly, working within local tradition, while also handling the Venetian dominance in a diplomatic fashion.

In 1576, he requested that the Jesuits be called to Verona to found a school.

Valier died in Rome on 24 May 1606.

== Works ==
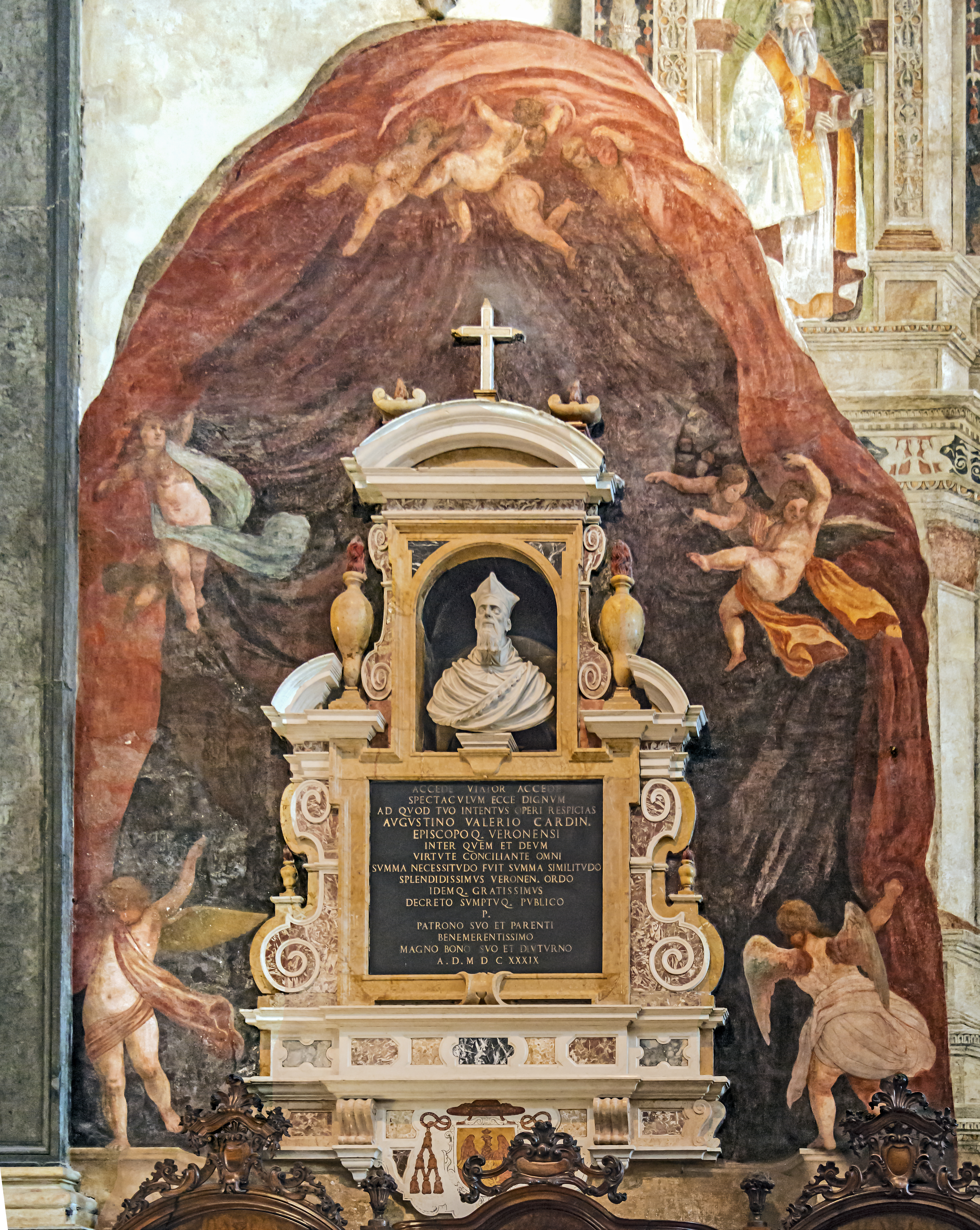
Monument to Agostino Valier Cathedral of Verona

Valier wrote a biography of Carlo Borromeo shortly after his death in 1584, and a history of Venice to 1580. He later became prefect of the Congregation of the Index. The atmosphere of close scrutiny of works is thought to have affected his wish for publication in his own lifetime. One work left unpublished was Philippus sive de laetitia Christiana, referencing Filippo Neri in its title, and dwelling on Carlo Borromeo and his nephew Federigo Borromeo, whom Valier had mentored, in a neostoic vein.

- Rhetorica Ecclesiastica (1570) in Latin, a work based on mission work in the Veneto. This work by Valier employing classical rhetoric as a resource for preaching, with subsequent works by Luis de Granada and Diego de Estella, is considered a significant development in the Catholic tradition. A French translation by Joseph Antoine Toussaint Dinouart, La rhétorique du prédicateur, was published in 1750.
- Instruttione delle donne maritate (1575), a book for wives, in the form of a letter to his married sister.
- De cautione adhibenda in edendis libris (1719).

Valier was one of the editors of the Clementine Vulgate. He took a sceptical line on much of the content of the Acta Sanctorum.

== Notes ==
Catholic Church titles
Preceded by Bernardo Navagero	Bishop of Verona; 1565–1606	Succeeded by Alberto Valier
Preceded by Gianfrancesco Commendone	Cardinal-Priest of San Marco; 1585–1605	Succeeded by Giovanni Delfino (seniore)
Preceded by Marcantonio Colonna (seniore)	Prefect of the Congregation of the Index; 1587–1597	Succeeded by Philippe de Lénoncourt
Preceded by Alessandro Ottaviano de' Medici	Cardinal-Bishop of Palestrina; 1605–1606	Succeeded by Ascanio Colonna
