= Francesco Badoer =

Francesco Badoer may refer to:

- Francesco Badoer (1507–1564)
- Francesco Badoer (1512–1572), built the Villa Badoer
- Francesco Badoer (1570–1610)
