= Paulus Manutius =

Venetian printer (1512–1574)

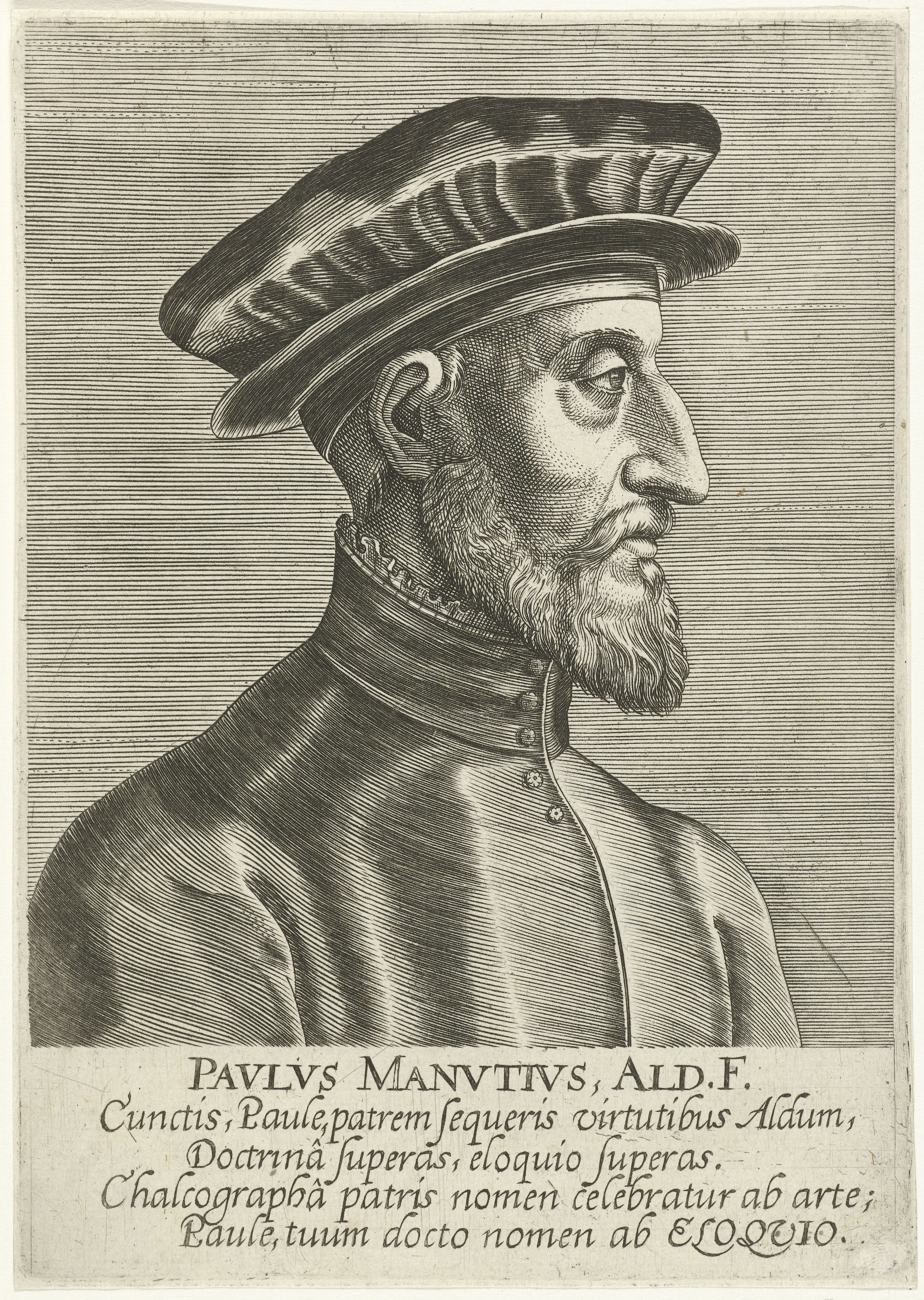
- Paulus Manutius, illustration in Imagines L. Doctorum Virorum (1595)
- Born: Paolo Manuzio; 12 June 1512; Venice, Republic of Venice
- Died: 6 April 1574; Rome, Papal States
- Burial place: Santa Maria sopra Minerva, Rome
- Occupations: Renaissance humanist; printer; publisher
- Children: Aldus Manutius the Younger
- Parents: Aldus Manutius (father); Maria Torresano (mother)
- Relatives: Antonio Manuzio

Signature
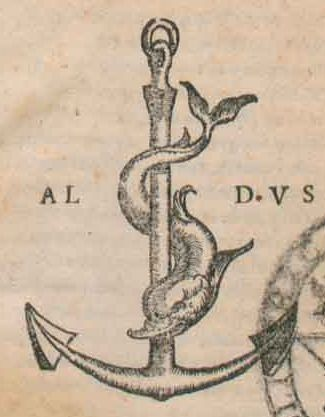

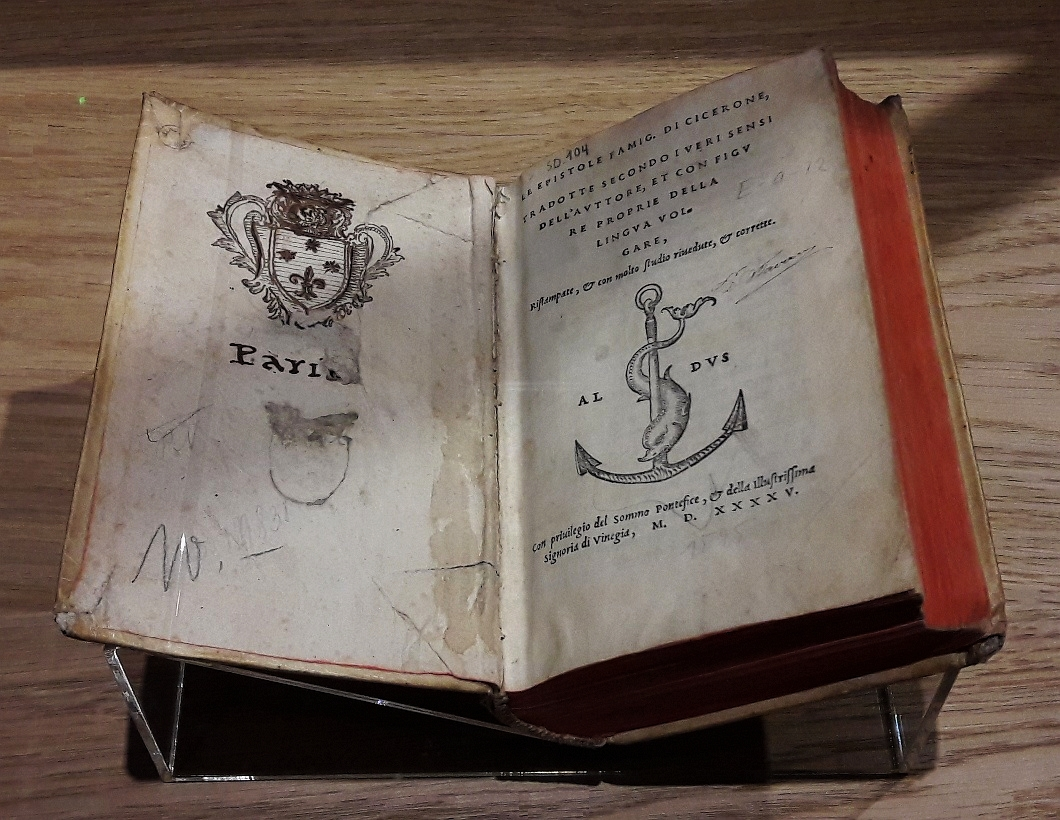
Le epistole famig. di Cicerone, Venice, Paulus Manutius, 1545

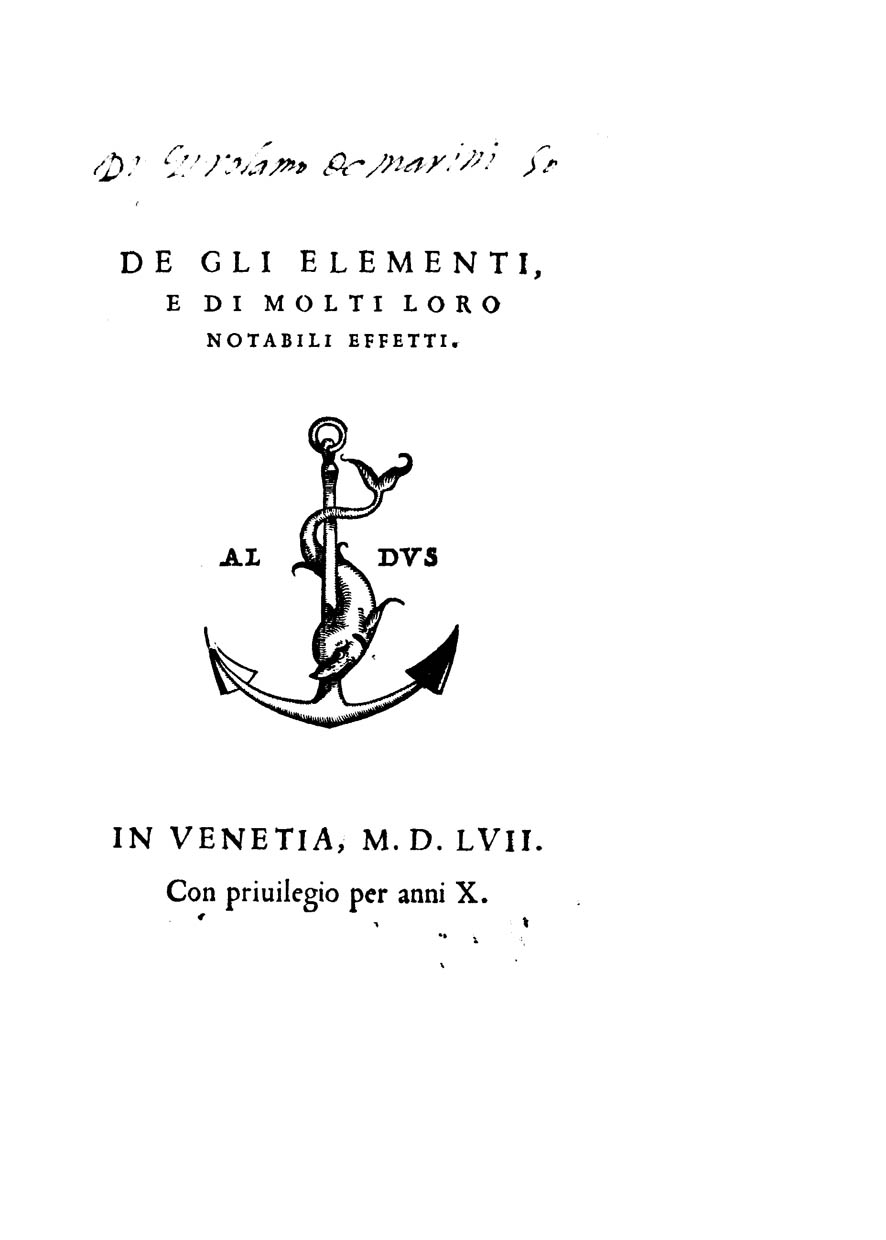
De gli elementi e di molti loro notabili effetti, 1557

Paulus Manutius (/məˈnjuːʃiəs/ mə-NEW-shee-əs; Italian: Paolo Manuzio [ˈpaːolo maˈnuttsjo]; 12 June 1512 – 6 April 1574) was an Italian (Venetian) printer with a humanist education, the third son of the famous printer Aldus Manutius and his wife Maria Torresano.

== Life ==
As a young man, Paulus Manutius moved to Venice to get an education and was well received by his father's old friends Pietro Bembo, Ramberto, and Egnatio. During Paulus' education his grandfather, Andrea Torresani and two uncles, Frederick and Francesco, carried on the Aldine Press. Andrea Torresani died in October 1528 which brought disputes between Paulus and his uncles that halted the work of the press for four years. In 1533 Paulus assumed direction of his father's business. In that first year alone, the press issued eleven titles. From 1536 to 1539, Paulus was involved in a lawsuit against his uncles in an effort to reclaim his father's italic type. In 1539, Paulus won.

Paulus was a passionate Ciceronian, and perhaps his chief contributions to scholarship are the corrected editions of Cicero's letters and orations (Epistolae ad familiares in 1540, Epistolae ad Atticum and Epistolae ad Marcum Iunium Brutum et ad Quintum Ciceronem fratrem in 1547), his own epistles in a Ciceronian style, and his Latin version of Demosthenes' Philippics (Demosthenis orationes quattuor contra Philippum, 1549). Throughout his life he combined the occupations of a scholar and a printer. As a scholar he is remembered for four elegant Latin treatises on Roman antiquities. His correct editions of the classics, printed in a splendid style, were highly esteemed, yet sales did not always support such productions; in 1556 he received for a time external support from the Venetian Academy founded by Federico Badoer. But Badoer failed disgracefully in 1559, and the academy was extinct in 1562.

Meanwhile, Paulus had established his brother, Antonio in a printing office and book shop at Bologna. Antonio died in 1559, having been a source of trouble and expense to Paulus during the last four years of his life. Other pecuniary embarrassments arose from a contract for supplying fish to Venice, into which Paulus had somewhat strangely entered with the government.

=== In Rome ===
In 1561, Pope Pius IV invited him to Rome, offering him a yearly stipend of 500 ducats, and undertaking to establish and maintain his press there. The profits on publications were to be divided between Paulus Manuzio and the Papal Treasury. Paulus accepted the invitation, and spent the larger portion of his time, under three pontiffs, with varying fortunes, in the city of Rome. The Vatican was eager to make effective use of the press to counter the growing influence of Protestant publications from beyond the Alps and his Roman editions for the Stamperia del Popolo Romano were mostly Latin works of theology and Biblical or patristic literature. They included Reginald Pole's De Concilio and Reformatio Angliae (both 1562) and official publications from the Council of Trent such as the Canones et decreta (1564) the Index Librorum Prohibitorum (1564), the Catechismus (1566), and the Breviarium Romanum (1568). Ill-health, the commercial interests he had left behind at Venice, and the lack of interest shown by Pope Pius V, left Paulus ready to travel back to Venice in 1570, having spent nine years in Rome.

=== Later years and death ===
On April 6, 1574, Paulus Manutius died at 61 and was buried at the Dominican Church of Rome.

== Works ==
- In epistolas Ciceronis ad Atticum, 1546.
- Commentarius in epistolas M. Tullii Ciceronis ad M. Junium Brutum, et ad Q. Ciceronem Fratrem, 1557.
- De gli elementi e di molti loro notabili effetti (in Italian). Venezia: Paolo Manuzio. 1557.
- Ciceronis in M. Antonium, 1572.
- In Ciceronis orationem pro Archia poeta commentarius, 1572.

== Bibliography ==
- Renouard, Antoine-Augustin (1834). Annales de l'imprimerie des Alde ou histoire des trois Manuces et de leurs éditions. Paris.

== See also ==
- Aldus Manutius
- Aldine Press
- Aldus Manutius the Younger
