= Federico Badoer =

Federico Badoer (1519–1593) was a diplomat of the Republic of Venice whose career was derailed in the 1560s by debts and unauthorized diplomacy.

Badoer was born on 2 January 1519 in Venice. His father was Alvise Badoer. He was a promising youth, being praised by Pietro Bembo, Paolo Manuzio, Daniele Barbaro, Claudio Tolomei and Pietro Aretino. He was elected a Savio agli Ordini in 1539. On 28 February 1547, he was sent as an ambassador extraordinary to the court of Duke Guidobaldo II of Urbino to give the republic's condolences on the death of the Duchess Giulia da Varano. On 10 August 1549, he was named ambassador to the court of King Ferdinand I of Germany, where he resided from 1550 to 1552. He succeeded Francesco Badoer.

In 1553, Badoer served as Avogador di Comun. On 24 March 1554, he was named ambassador to the court of Charles V, Holy Roman Emperor, where he arrived in November. His goal was to prevent Cosimo de' Medici from acquiring the Republic of Siena. After Charles's abdication in 1556, he went to the court of King Philip II of Spain.

Badoer returned to Venice in February 1557. Later that year, he founded the Accademia della Fama also known as Accademia Veneziana. The academy had the support of Domenico Venier and his circle of poets. Venier was Badoer's long-time friend.

In 1558, Francesco Patrizi wrote a praise poem, Badoaro, in his honour. After he defaulted on the many debts he incurred funding his upstart academy, the Venetian Senate ordered his arrest on 19 August 1561, along with his nephews, Alvise, Giustiniano and Giovanni. The Accademia was shut down by the government.

Badoer's legal troubles lasted for years. On 7 December 1568, a warrant was again issued of his arrest for improper dealings with a foreign prince, Duke Henry II of Brunswick-Wolfenbüttel, who wished to settle in Venice. (In 1542, the Council of Ten had forbidden Venetian patricians from dealing with foreigners in Venice without authorization.) On 15 December, the Council confiscated 13,375 scudi and 9,314 ducats that the duke had given Badoer to purchase property on his behalf. He was freed pending trial. On 30 January 1569, he married Elisabetta Malipiero, who brought him a dowry of 22,000 ducats. On 23 January 1570, he was acquitted.

Badoer was not heavily involved in politics after the legal troubles of the 1560s. In 1582–1583, he argued before the Maggior Consiglio in favour of reducing the power of the Council of Ten. He died on 13 November 1593 and was buried in the church of San Canziano.

== Bibliography ==
- Bolzoni, Lina (1981). "Il 'Badoaro' di Francesco Patricius e l'Accademia Veneziana della Fama". Giornale Storico della Letteratura Italiana. 18: 71–101.
- Dal Prete, Ivano (2014). "'Being the World Eternal…': The Age of the Earth in Renaissance Italy". Isis. 105 (2): 292–317. doi:10.1086/676568. PMID 25154134.
- Graheli, Shanti (2013). "Reading the History of the Academia Venetiana through Its Book Lists". In Malcolm Walsby; Natasha Constantinidou (eds.). Documenting the Early Modern Book World: Inventories and Catalogues in Manuscript and Print. Brill. pp. 283–319.
- Quaintance, Courtney (2015). Textual Masculinity and the Exchange of Women in Renaissance Venice. University of Toronto Press. ISBN 978-1-4426-4913-2.
- Rosenthal, Margaret F. (2012). The Honest Courtesan: Veronica Franco, Citizen and Writer in Sixteenth-Century Venice. University of Chicago Press. ISBN 978-0-226-72812-4.
- Stella, Aldo (1963). "Badoer, Federico". Dizionario Biografico degli Italiani (in Italian). Vol. 5: Bacca–Baratta. Rome: Istituto dell'Enciclopedia Italiana. OCLC 883370.
- Turba, Gustav, ed. (1892). Venetianische Depeschen vom Kaiserhofe. Vol. 2. Vienna: F. Tempsky.
