= Gino Luzzatto =

Italian economic historian

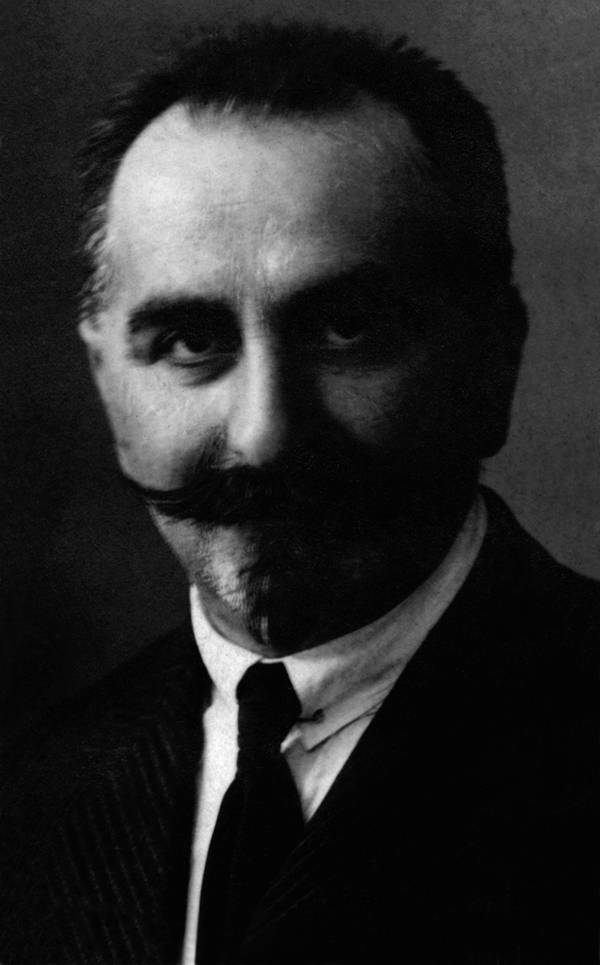
Gino Luzzato in 1927

Gino Luzzatto (9 January 1878 – 30 March 1964) was an Italian economic historian. He initially worked as a teacher in southern Italy before joining an economic institute in Trieste and later relocated to the University of Venice in 1922, where he eventually became a rector. Luzzatto became a member of the Socialist Party in 1906. However, with the rise of Mussolini's fascists, he faced challenges in publishing his work. He was imprisoned for several months in 1925, and despite his protests, he was compelled to retire in 1938 due to the establishment of Italian racial laws. Luzzatto was from a Jewish household. After the end of the war, he became rector again and led the institute until 1953.

Under the initial influence of Werner Sombart, whose main work he translated, Gino Luzzatto's scientific pursuits gradually shifted towards the study of urban economies, particularly focusing on the late Middle Ages, with Venice being his primary area of interest. His research shed light on the growing influence of merchants over ruling authorities and the manorial aspects of the economy. In the process, he became one of the best experts on the holdings of the State Archives of Venice, which he visited almost daily from 1922 to 1964.

== Life and work ==
Gino Luzzatto was the fifth and last son of Giuseppe and Amelia Salom. His mother was a native of Venice, while his father was from Gorizia. In 1894, following the local tradition for Venetian families, Luzzatto began his studies in humanities (Lettere) at the University of Padua. Additionally, he attended lectures on legal history taught by Nino Tamassia. After completing his doctoral degree, he relocated to Florence and joined the Istituto Superiore Giovanni Marinelli, where he became deeply involved in the research conducted by the geographer Giuseppe Pennesi (1851-1909) concerning voyages of discovery. Notably, his doctoral thesis focused on a 17th-century historian, with no particular economic objective.

=== Southern Italy, a departure from the "heroic" historiography ===
Luzzatto went to a high school in the southern Italian city of Potenza. During this period, he engaged in writing studies on modern history, including a piece on Brigantism in Basilicata following the establishment of the Italian state in 1860. However, this particular study remained unfinished.

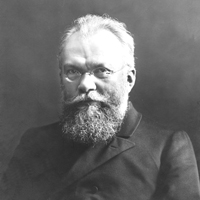
Karl Lamprecht

Karl Lamprecht's publications influenced Luzzatto to concentrate on feudalism's history and society, and less on the "court." Nevertheless, as he moved away from political-dynastic historiography, he was careful not to limit himself to statistically tangible points of view. Individual judgments, situational conditions, and the constellation's uniqueness were as important to him as the notion of supra-individual forces. His polemic against the uncontrolled, methodologically unsupported use of statistics made him known in wider circles for the first time. Without wanting to underestimate the importance of the numerical recording of historical conditions and processes, he nevertheless rejected the "mania of numbers".

=== Urbino, Pisa, Bari, turn to urban and commercial history (1902-1919) ===
Luzzatto moved from Grosseto in 1901, where he had been teaching to Urbino in 1910 in order to continue his research on the Marche region. (Note: When exactly is not mentioned in the literature, probably the year 190) Subsequently, he decided to enroll in law at the University of Urbino, not intending to change his professional career but rather to cultivate a systematic approach and provide a counterbalance to the methods of the time. During this period, he dealt with Jewish bankers in ducal Urbino and also explored contemporary economic developments in Russia.

In 1902, Luzzatto was among the first to start working for the magazine Le Marche, which primarily focused on local studies under the editorship of Amedeo Crivellucci (1850-1914). Even after moving to Pisa in 1910, he continued his work. For the first time, Luzzatto's research interests and capabilities became apparent, particularly in his investigations into the "subjugation" of the rural nobility by the municipalities in the Marche region. He frequently explored themes such as the concentration on the markets and crafts in urban areas, the displacement of the feudal rural nobility to the communes, and the development of local laws through their own authority. However, after his work on the Servi, (Note: Servi can mean unfree servants (servi non casati), but also a variety of legal gradations up to slaves. Luzzatto was concerned with the transitions between these groups in the landed estates, which were usually difficult to discern. In addition to those who did not have their own farmstead, there were servi cottidiani, for example, who sat on their own farmsteads near the manors and had to perform work on the manor as day laborers.) his attention gradually shifted toward urban history, specifically examining the dominance of the Curtes, the farm landlords, within the context of his studies. (Note: I servi nelle grandi proprietà ecclesiastiche italiane dei secoli IX e X, Pisa 1910.)

Instead, he considered the urban impulses as greater, and as a result, the merchants' position was critical in this. This perspective becomes especially evident in his later writings on the economic history of the Republic of Venice, which primarily focused on trade. In 1910, Luzzatto was appointed to the Istituto Superiore in Bari, adding his expertise in the field. His publication "Storia del Commercio" in 1914 demonstrates that he was already on the right track in terms of his exploration of the history of commerce. Additionally, Luzzatto's study of the small Marche town of Matelica showcased his analytical approach. He analyzed the town's fiscal organization, drawing conclusions about its political economy and the internal structure of the political elite(s). Through this approach, Luzzatto moved away from the common study of legal states solely based on legal texts and statutes, which make claims but rarely indicate if the necessary circumstances have been achieved.

=== Member of the PSDI (from 1906) ===
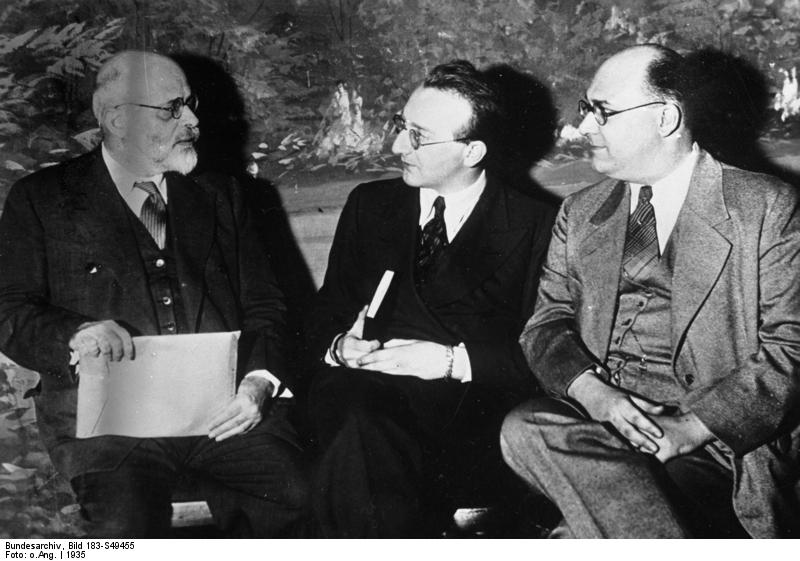
Gaetano Salvemini, during a session of the American Academy of Political and Social Sciences, founded in 1889, in New York, 1935

Luzzatto joined the Socialist Party (PSDI) in 1906 while living in Pisa. However, he never fully embraced its collectivist and internationalist ideologies. Instead, Luzzatto remained an individualist. Simultaneously, he held moderate patriotic sentiments and advocated for the rights of the marginalized "forgotten classes." Between 1911 and 1920, Luzzatto authored numerous articles published in Salvemini's L'Unità, expressing his views. After 1918, he acknowledged his previous excessive focus on materialist perspectives and admitted to underestimating the importance of morality, both at the collective and individual levels. He recognized that the struggles between the Ghibellines and Guelphs involved more than just the conflict between papal and imperial parties.

Luzzatto believed in the positive interaction between his experiences and his political involvement. In Italy, he recognized the close relationship between protectionism and colonialism, which not only protected unjustified economic benefits to certain sectors but also diverted attention from social problems. Although he had lived in Bari, Luzzatto was less focused on the specific issues of the Mezzogiorno (southern Italy). Instead, he discussed the costs of the Libyan conquest and the role of Irredentism in Italy as early as 1912.

=== Trieste, Venice, economic history (from 1919) ===
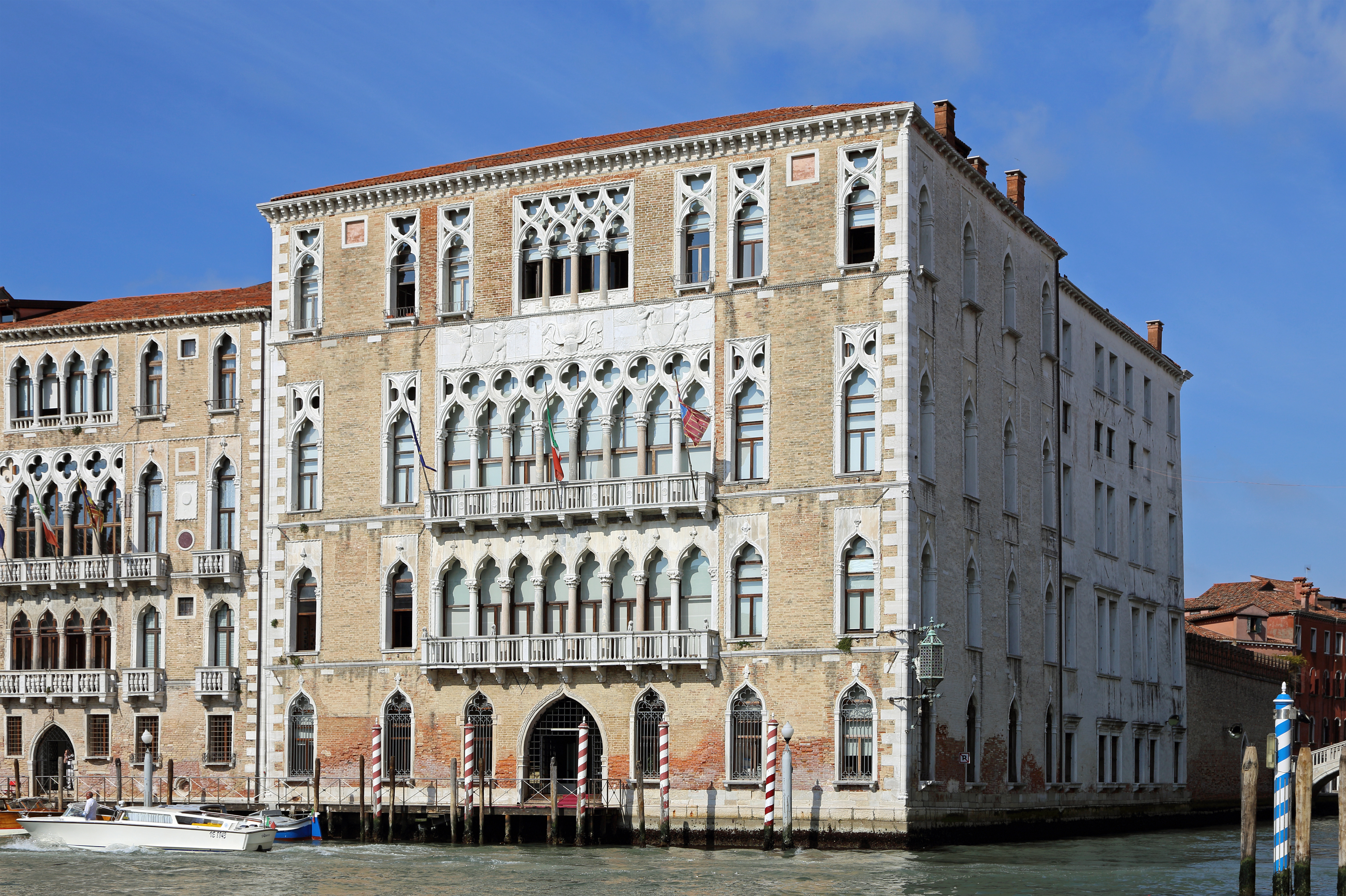
Cà Foscari, headquarters of the University of Venice

In 1919, Luzzatto moved from Bari to Trieste, where he began to teach economic history at the Istituto Superiore di Scienze Economiche e Sociali, part of the University of Ca' Fòscari in Venice. (Note: This institute was founded in 1868 on the initiative of three men: Venetian Luigi Luzzatti, Francesco Ferrara, who led the Institute for three decades, and Province President Edoardo Deodati.) This institute was one of the eight national economic institutions operating under the Ministry of Economics rather than the Ministry of Education. Over time, with the efforts of individuals like Fabio Besta, (Note: Director from 1914 to 1917.) Luigi Armanni, (Note: Director from 1919 to 1922.) and Tommaso Fornari, the economic institute gradually transformed into a university with multiple faculties. During World War I, the institute temporarily moved to Pisa in 1917. Finally, in 1921, Luzzatto was appointed to the University of Venice.

=== Fascism (1922-1943/1945) ===
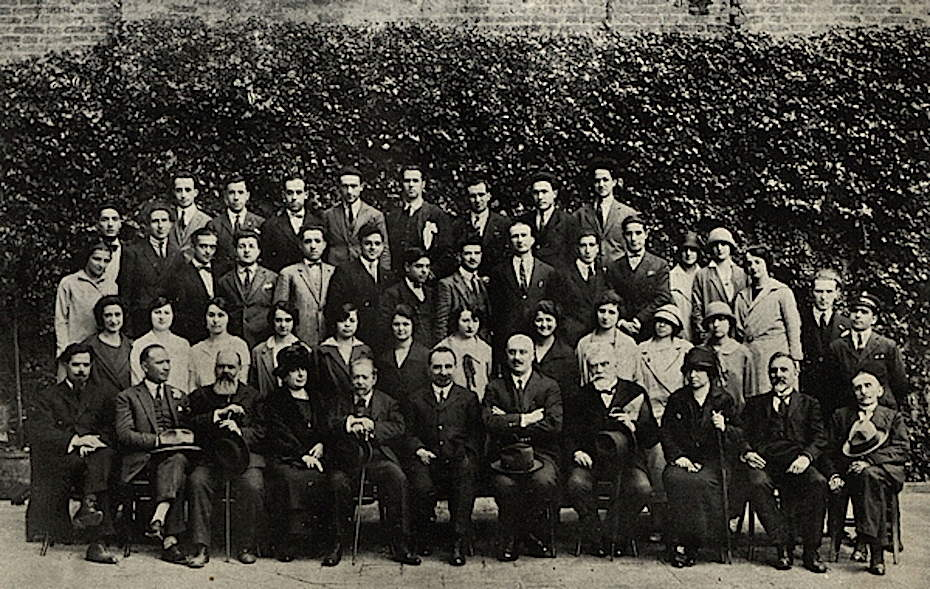
Luzzatto, director of the Regia Scuola Superiore di Commercio (first row, middle) in the group of sezioni magistrali of the year 1924/1925

In 1922, Mussolini's party came into power, and prior to that, the Fascists, led by Davide Giordano, had already won the elections in Venice in 1920. Due to political reasons, the Fascists in Venice held hostility towards Luzzatto's institute. However, it was after the consolidation of power and internal disputes within the regime that the pressure on Luzzatto increased. The regime fabricated a resignation request from Luzzatto, who had never submitted such a request. Eventually, this false resignation was accepted.

Luzzatto continued his work in secret. In 1927, Davide Giordano, the former fascist mayor took over the provisional direction of the Scuola superiore di economia at the Venetian University. On April 25, 1928, Luzzatto was arrested and escorted to Milan. However, Luzzatto was released in May due to insufficient evidence against him.

In 1925, Luzzatto signed Benedetto Croce's manifesto against the fascists, which was published in Il Mondo. During that year, he also served as the director of the Institute and published a translation of Werner Sombart's Modern Capitalism, which amounted to 418 pages. On November 4, 1925, socialist politician Tito Zaniboni was arrested on allegations of plotting to assassinate Mussolini. The government took advantage of this event to escalate retaliation against its opponents and manipulate public opinion. In Venice, Silvio Trentin and Ernesto Cesare Longobardi, colleagues of Luzzatto, encountered threats of violence from fascist students in the Ca' Foscari courtyard unless they distanced themselves from Luzzatto. On November 16, Luzzatto was compelled to resign from his position due to pressure from the Ministry of Economy. Ferruccio Truffi succeeded him and held the office until November 1927. Silvio Trentin, Luzzatto's colleague, chose to exile in France at the end of January 1926. The Institute of Economics was placed under the Ministry of Education, known as the Ministero dell'Educazione Nazionale, in 1928. Despite this change, the institute, the only remaining one among the original eight, maintained a significant level of independence. However, the university made efforts to resist, organizing a series of lectures on the theory of civil liberties under the guidance of Luigi Armanni. Luzzatto mentioned these lectures in his inaugural speech after the end of World War II in 1945. Starting from 1932, Luzzatto noted that it became too risky to openly criticize the regime, and the constant surveillance threatened to destroy the students' freedom of thought that the intimidated lecturers were meant to teach them. This situation worsened during the 20-month period of Nazi occupation.

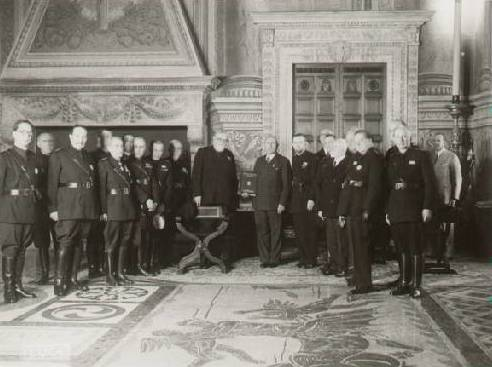
Giovanni Gentile presenting the Enciclopedia italiana to Benito Mussolini in Rome's Palazzo Venezia, 1937

From 1930 to 1942, Luzzatto served as the director of the Nuova Rivista Storica. However, he had to resign from this position due to the implementation of the Italian racial laws in 1938. In 1929, he wrote a comprehensive work on the bonds of the Republic of Venice. (Note: I prestiti della Repubblica di Venezia. (Sec. XIII–XV). Introduzione storica e documenti, Padua 1929 (R. Accademia dei Lincei. Documenti finanziari della Repubblica di Venezia, editi dalla Commissione per gli Atti delle Assemblee Costituzionali Italiane, serie III, vol. I, parte I).) In 1932, he provided an overview of recent works on economic history in Italy and made numerous contributions to the Enciclopedia Italiana, which was formed in 1925 by Giovanni Treccani and was initially led by Giovanni Gentile, the editor of the Manifesto degli intellettuali fascisti, a manifesto of fascist intellectuals. While Benedetto Croce distanced himself from this manifesto and published a counter-manifesto called the Manifesto degli intellettuali antifascisti. Gentile headed the Scuola Normale Superiore in Pisa and was the scientific director of the Treccani Institute until 1938. He additionally held the role of vice president of the institute until 1938. Despite their political differences, Luzzatto's works were mainly published in the Treccani Encyclopedia from 1929 to 1935. (Note: He wrote numerous articles on Central European urban histories, such as Altona (storia), Amburgo (storia), Amsterdam (storia: fino all'assedio di Anversa), Lega Anseatica, Anversa (storia), Brema (storia), Bruges (storia: fino al 1900), Lipsia (storia), Lubecca (storia), to terms like Schiavitù (medioevo ed età moderna), Spezie (medioevo ed età moderna), Banca, Compagnia (commercio), as well as to German historians ( Alfons Dopsch, Alfred Doren or Ernst Ludwig Dümmler ).)

In 1931, Luzzatto signed the oath of allegiance that the regime required of all university teachers. Despite being a prominent figure in the Giustizia e Libertà group, Luzzatto found a lack of inspiration from political activity throughout Italy's fascist period. His home on Campo San Gallo, where he lived with his sister, became a gathering place for opponents of the fascist regime. In a letter to his colleague Corrado Barbagallo in January 1938, Luzzatto voiced his concern that the Fascists were not simply interested in intimidating, but were executing a well-prepared plan to accomplish "concrete results".

A constant feature in Luzzatto's work was his emphasis on individual and specific sources, such as council decisions, court judgments, wills, treaties, international agreements, and theoretical treatises. He demonstrated this approach in his study on the bonds of the Republic of Venice. In contrast to Fabio Besta's research, which aimed to highlight the balance and harmony of the state and financial system to the old Venetian tradition. Luzzatto, along with Tommaso Bertelè, Roberto Cessi, and others, were able to show that the collapse of the system of borrowing to finance expensive state tasks, such as war and grain supply, was primarily caused by the nobility's desire to evade their financial responsibilities towards the state. The conflict between class interests and the emerging state, according to Luzzatto, was a crucial driving force in this context. Luzzatto's examination of the 1379 census revealed a significant division within the nobility, with a small wealthy group and a larger segment facing poverty. Among the 1,200 households included in the census, approximately two-thirds possessed limited wealth, and many were unable to contribute to the financing of state functions, which was the primary purpose of the census. Marin Sanudo expressed his disappointment, noting that the majority of the 3,000 nobles lived in extreme modesty.

Luzzatto focused on the Venetian social structure known as "commenda" and its legal framework in 1934.

In 1936, he translated the economic history of Italy by his Jewish colleague Alfred Doren into Italian. Interestingly, Luzzatto had to publish his report on the economic activities of the Venetian patriciate in the French journal Annales in 1937. (Note: Les activités économiques du patriciat vénitien)

Due to fascist racial legislation, Luzzatto was compelled to retire in 1938, and his position was held by Amintore Fanfani, whom Luzzatto himself had recommended. From that point on, Luzzatto began publishing under the pseudonym Giuseppe Padovan. His work on The Middle Ages (313-1492) could no longer be published due to the racial laws, and the second part of his Economic History of Modernity and the Present was published with a fictitious date of 1938 to bypass these laws, even though it was actually printed in 1939. His translation of K. Robert Greenfield's work on the economy in the Risorgimento (1940) was published without his name being mentioned. Many of his articles published in Popolo or Rivista di storia economica, under the names G. Padovan or Giuseppe Padovan, were not included in his collection of studies, Studi di storia economica, published in 1954. In 1961, Luzzatto wrote an article on the economic situation of Jewish communities between the March on Rome and the Italian racial laws, covering the period from 1922 to 1938.

On the one hand, Luzzatto dealt with didactic writings; on the other, he focused mainly on the 12th and 13th centuries, a time when aristocratic forms of rule were less prevalent and small merchants contributed significantly to the overall wealth of the city than that of big capital.

Luzzatto served as vice president of the Jewish community during those years. Unfortunately, despite his efforts, he was unable to prevent the marginalization and annihilation of the Jewish community.

Following the downfall of the dictatorship, Luzzatto's reappointment on September 1, 1943, was prevented by the Republic of Salò, a short-lived revival of the fascist regime. Consequently, he sought accommodation with his colleague Raffaele Ciasca, an economic history lecturer at the University of Genoa.

=== Rector (1945-1953), library president and local politician ===
After the end of the war, Luzzatto returned to Ca' Foscari and was elected rector from the 6 July 1945 to 1953. In 2015, his inaugural address was rediscovered. From 1946 to 1951, he also served as the financial assessor for the Partito Socialista Unitario, and later as a Consigliere until 1958. During this time, Luzzatto was able to directly address the long-standing issues that had been troubling him within a specific context. His engagement with relatively "current" matters was not entirely unfamiliar, as his work on the economic changes in Lombardy from 1860 to 1922 shows.

Luzzatto's contributions were recognized when he became a corresponding member of the Accademia dei Lincei in 1947, and later a full member (socio nazionale) in 1950. In the same year, he also joined the Partito Socialista dei Lavoratori Italiani (Italian Socialist Party of Workers).

He published the economic history of Italy in 1949, but he never had the chance to continue or revise it due to his numerous other commitments. One of these commitments was his presidency of the Biblioteca Querini Stampalia, a position he held from 1950 to 1964. Despite his busy schedule, he continued to write articles for notable publications like Il Mondo, Critica Sociale, and Il Caffè. His articles covered various subjects, including the "crisis of social democracy" and the works of Achille Loria in the Rassegna mensile di Israel. Additionally, he occasionally provided commentary on Israel, addressing topics such as the country's economic situation.

In 1952, he resumed the position of director of Nuova Rivista Storica, which he had left a decade earlier due to the impact of racist laws. He led the magazine until 1963 and continued to contribute to it until shortly before his death.

=== Economic history of Venice from the 11th to the 16th century (1958-1961) ===
Luzzatto was nearly 80 years old when he began researching the economic history of the Republic of Venice in 1958. His primary focus had always been on trade, rather than production or consumption, and he paid little attention to guild disputes over privileges and competencies. His book "Storia economica di Venezia dall'XI al XVI secolo" published in 1961, has become a fundamental reference in the field.

=== Late writings ===
During his final years, Luzzatto dedicated himself to various economic subjects. He researched the economic history of Venice from 1797 to 1866, examining the economic consequences of the First World War and sharing his insights on the RAI radio station. Together with his friend and colleague Frederic Lane, he wrote a book on Venice's "Public Debt," which primarily involved a floating debt known as Monte, consisting of compulsory and voluntary bonds with interest. Luzzatto also wrote introductions for various works and continued to contribute numerous reviews. Unfortunately, he was unable to complete his work on the economic history of Italy from 1861 to 1914.

After Gino Luzzatto's demise, a thorough list of his publications was compiled. Angelo Tursi's list, initiated in 1949, includes 277 contributions, along with 236 reviews. However, this list does not include 65 unpublished articles written for the Treccani Encyclopedia. Andrea Caracausi compiled a separate list, which contains a total of 772 titles.

== The estate ==
The estate of Luzzatto is preserved in the Ca'Foscari economics library, S. Giobbe, Cannaregio 873. Omar Mazzotti cataloged this collection, which became publicly accessible in 1965. Within the collection, there are 18 buste containing a wealth of material, including 1,236 letters spanning from 1935 to 1964. These letters were likely numbered by Luzzatto's niece in an initial effort to organize them. Additionally, there are letters stored in other buste. The "Inventario virtuale" is designed to assist in indexing and organizing the holdings of Luzzatto's estate. Furthermore, Giovanni Zalin's research on the correspondence between Luzzatto and Luigi Einaudi in 2004 indicates that these materials can be valuable for studying other biographies as well.

== Effect ==
In 1988, Carlo Cipolla recognized Luzzatto as one of the most significant economic historians, alongside Marc Bloch and Henri Pirenne. Luzzatto's impact on the study of Venetian economics, particularly during the late Middle Ages, is difficult to overstate. Unlike focusing solely on institutional and legal history, Luzzatto extensively utilized sources that originated within the economic sphere itself. He emphasized the significance of society as a whole, drawing inspiration from Karl Lamprecht's cultural history approach. Consequently, Luzzatto rejected the limited perspective of evaluating society through legal and institutional history, as advocated by Georg von Below in Germany.

The historical sciences were not immune to the repercussions of the First World War, which can be seen by the demolition of the Prussian Historical Institute in Rome in 1915. This devastation continued by the control of the Italian fascist dictatorship, followed by the German fascist regime, both of which had no interest in economic history. Furthermore, for a long time, the main focus of German historiography of Italy was on the conflict between the emperor and communes or the pope, as well as the question of continuity between late Roman institutions and those of the Italian communes. This limited the focus on Venice and, therefore, to Luzzatto and his research topics.

Luzzatto has the honor of creating some of the most important historiographical works of the German-speaking world known in Italy through his translations. However, there is still a significant gap in translating Luzzatto's own major works into German, despite the fact that the primary works of his notable students have been translated into English and German.

His work was carried on by his pupils in Venice, which served as Luzzatto's primary research focus for several decades. Notably, Frederic C. Lane and his student Reinhold C. Mueller were instrumental in continuing Luzzatto's research. Furthermore, Luzzatto's work influenced the Anglo-Saxon academic sphere and, since the late 1970s, the German-speaking world, including scholars such as Gerhard Rösch.

== Main works ==
- Storia economica dell'età moderna e contemporanea. Padua 1920.
- I prestiti della Repubblica di Venezia (Sec. XIII–XV). Introduzione storica e documenti. Padua 1929.
- Studi di storia economica veneziana. Padua 1954.
- Luzzatto, Gino (1993) [1958]. Breve storia economica dell'Italia medievale. Dalla caduta dell'Impero romano al principio del Cinquecento. Turin: Einaudi. ISBN 88-06-04572-5..
- Storia economica di Venezia dall' XI al XVI secolo. Venedig 1961.
- Il debito pubblico della Repubblica di Venezia. Dagli ultimi decenni del XII secolo alla fine del XV. Mailand 1963, Nachdruck der I prestiti von 1929.
- Storia economica d’Italia il Medioevo. Florenz 1967
