= Navagero =

Navagero is an Italian surname. Notable people with the surname include:

- Andrea Navagero (1483–1529), Venetian diplomat and writer
- Bernardo Navagero (1507–1565), Venetian ambassador and cardinal
