= Elena Brambilla =

Italian historian (1942–2018)

- Born: July 29, 1942; Milan, Italy
- Died: February 3, 2018 (aged 75); Milan, Italy
- Citizenship: Italian
- Education: University of Milan
- Parents: Arturo Brambilla; Franca Brambilla Ageno
- Scientific career
- Fields: Modern history

Elena Brambilla (29 July 1942 – 3 February 2018) was an Italian historian.

== Biography ==
Elena Brambilla was born in Milan, 29 July 1942. She was the daughter of Franca Brambilla Ageno. Brambilla specialized in modern history, graduating in 1967 University of Milan.

She worked first as an assistant before becoming a professor at the Faculty of Letters and Philosophy of the University of Milan, starting in 1983. She coordinated the Italian-French university degree in two-year specialization in modern history. Between 1998 and 1999, she collaborated with the Italian-Germanic Historical Institute (ISIG) in Trento. She devoted herself in particular to the history of the university, of medicine, and of science, to the relations between State and Church, as well as the history of women and gender identity.

Brambilla wrote several essays and collaborated in editing some periodicals, such as Rivista di storia della filosofia, Rivista di storia della Chiesa in Italia, Rivista di studi politici internazionali, Società e storia, Diritto comunitario e degli scambi internazionali, Quaderni storici, Nuova Rivista Storica, Rivista Storica Italiana and Communications of the Political Research Center of the Sorbonne. She was a member of the board of Unicomli, providing a series of history editions for Lombardy.

Brambilla died in Milan, 3 February 2018.

== Selected works ==
- Bambini e genitori insieme: esperienze e proposte di catechesi familiare, Brescia, Morcelliana, 1981, p. 120.
- La città e la corte: buone e cattive maniere tra Medioevo ed età moderna, Guerini e associati, 1991, ISBN 9788878022799.
- with Giovanni Muto, La Lombardia spagnola, Milano, Unicopli, 1997, p. 426, ISBN 9788840004747.
- Alle origini del Sant'Uffizio: penitenza, confessione e giustizia spirituale dal Medioevo al XXVI secolo, Bologna, il Mulino, 2000 (1ª edizione), p. 590, ISBN 9788815077592.
- Genealogie del sapere: università, professioni giuridiche e nobiltà togata in Italia (XIII - XVII secolo), Milano, Unicopli, 2005, p. 384, ISBN 9788840010083.
- La giustizia intollerante: inquisizioni e tribunali confessionali in Europa (secoli IV-XVIII), Roma, Carocci Editore, 2006 (1ª edizione), p. 272, ISBN 9788843038756.
- with Carlo Capra, Aurora Scotti, Istituzioni e cultura in età napoleonica, Milano, FrancoAngeli, 2008, p. 657, ISBN 9788846498366.
- Routines of existence: time, life and after life in society and religion, Pisa, Pisa University Press, 2009, p. 120, ISBN 9788884926500.
- with Alessia Lirosi, Le cronache di Santa Cecilia: un monastero femminile a Roma in età moderna, Roma, Viella, 2009, p. 309, ISBN 9788883344282.
- with Daniel Armogathe, Du lien politique au lien social: les élites, Aix-en-Provence, UMR Telemme, 2009, p. 250.
- Corpi invasi e viaggi dell'anima: santità, possessione, esorcismo dalla teologia barocca alla medicina illuminista, Roma, Viella, 2010 (1ª edizione), p. 302, ISBN 9788883344176.
- with Letizia Arcangeli, Stefano Levati, Sociabilità e relazioni femminili nell'Europa moderna, Milano, FrancoAngeli, 2013, p. 323, ISBN 9788820435714.
- with Anne Jacobson Schutte, La storia di genere in Italia in età moderna: un confronto tra storiche nordamericane e italiane, Roma, Viella, 2014, p. 468, ISBN 9788867283422.
