= Aldus Manutius the Younger =

Italian printer and humanist (1547–1597)

- 18th-century bas-relief of Manutius, Padua
- Born: Aldo Manuzio; 13 February 1547; Venice, Republic of Venice
- Died: 28 October 1597 (aged 50); Rome, Papal States
- Occupations: Renaissance humanist; printer; publisher
- Employers: University of Bologna; University of Pisa; Sapienza University of Rome
- Movement: Late Renaissance
- Spouse: Francesca Lucrezia Giunti (m. 1572)
- Parents: Paulus Manutius (father); Caterina Odoni (mother)
- Relatives: Aldus Manutius the Elder (grandfather)

Aldus Manutius the Younger (/ˈɔːldəs məˈnjuːʃiəs/ AWL-dəs mə-NEW-shee-əs; Italian: Aldo Manuzio il Giovane [ˈaldo maˈnuttsjo il ˈdʒoːvane]; 13 February 1547 — 28 October 1597) was an Italian printer and humanist. The grandson of Aldus Manutius and son of Paulus Manutius, he was the last member of his family to be active in the Aldine Press that his grandfather founded.

== Life ==
=== Early years ===
Aldus was a precocious scholar. As early as 1557, when he was barely eleven, he published Eleganze della lingua Latina e toscana, a rhetoric textbook reprinted several times and translated into French (1557) and English (1573). In 1561, at the age of fourteen, he published a work upon Latin spelling, Orthographiae Ratio, whose second edition (1566) contains the earliest copy of an ancient Roman calendar written on marble and discovered in 1547 by his father Paolo in the Palace of Cardinal Bernardino Maffei, known as the Fasti Maffeiani. During a visit to his father at Rome in the next year, he specialized in the field of Latin epigraphy. In 1566, he published a valuable treatise on ancient inscriptions, De Veterum Notarum explanatione, quae in antiquis monumentis occurrunt.

=== Aldine Press ===
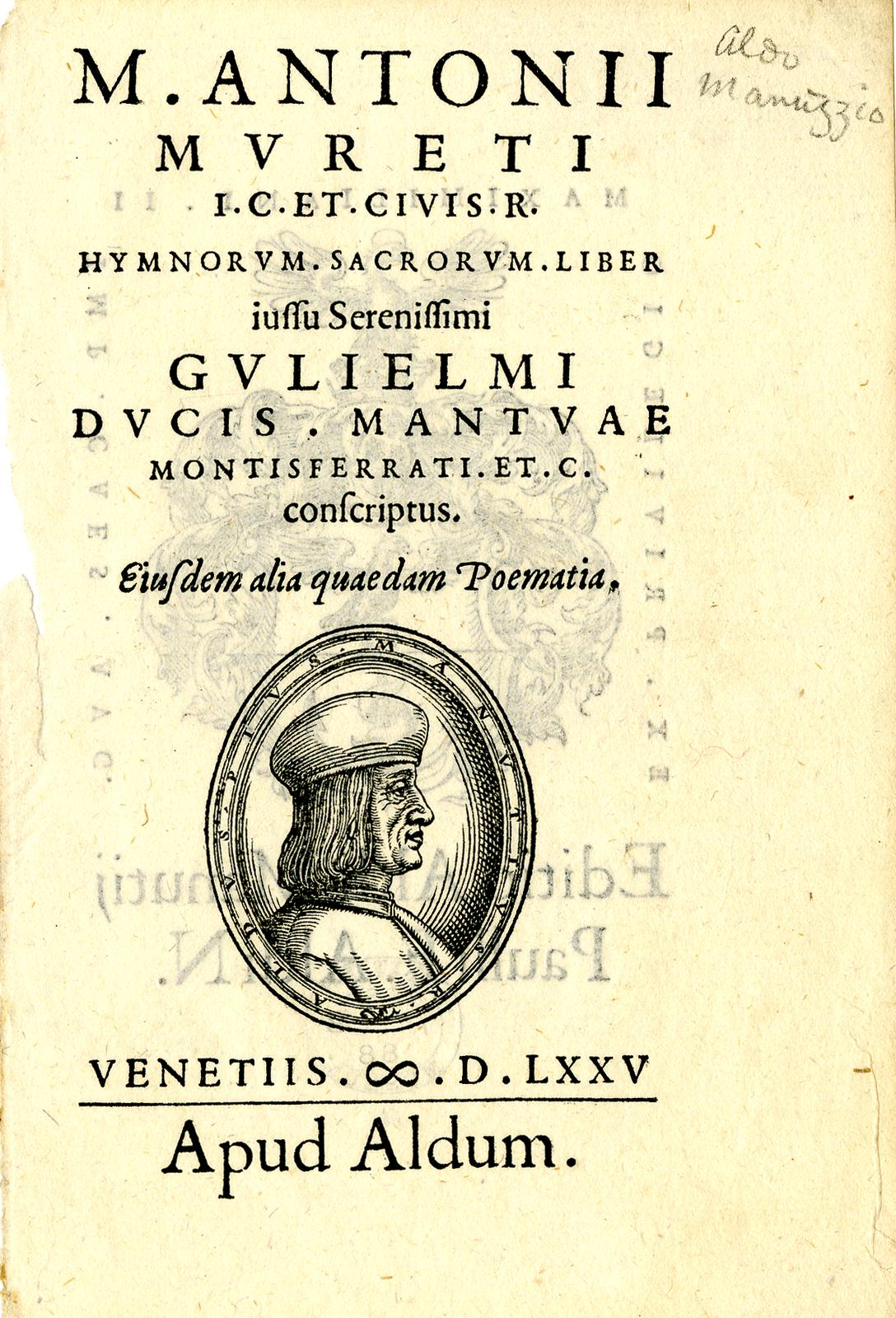
Muretus' Hymnorum Sacrorum Liber printed by Aldus Manutius the Younger, 1575

When his father was called by Pope Pius IV to direct the Tipografia del Popolo Romano in Rome, Aldus was appointed to manage the Venice press. In 1570 he befriended the French scholar Claude Dupuy, who was undertaking the traditional study tour in Italy. The exchanges between Aldus and Dupuy left a trace in the editions published by the Aldine Press in the following months, acknowledging Dupuy's assistance. In 1571 he published a critical edition of Velleius Paterculus' Roman History, accompanied by useful notes.

In 1572 Aldus married Francesca Lucrezia Giunti of the Giunti family of Florence. The marriage strengthened the connections between the two families. In collaboration with the Giunti, Aldus edited an extensive collection of Italian letters that proved highly successful. After his father's death in 1574, Manutius became the head of the printing establishment. In this period he published his Epitome orthographiae (1575) and his commentary on Horace's Ars poetica (1576) and was appointed professor of Literature at the chancery in Venice.

Numerous universities courted him because of his renown as a classical scholar. In 1585 he accepted the chair of Rhetoric at Bologna, where he published his life of Cosimo de' Medici (1586). He left in 1587 to take up the Chair in Rhetoric and Belles Lettres at the University of Pisa. Though he had left Venice in 1585, his printing press continued to work under the direction of his partner, Niccolò Manassi.

=== In Rome ===
In 1588 Aldus was called to Rome to fill the chair of humanities at the university left vacant by the death of Muretus. In 1590 he was appointed director of the Vatican press by Pope Clement VIII. Angelo Rocca, who established the Biblioteca Angelica, the oldest public library in Europe, was one of his closest associates.

More adept at scholarship than commerce, Aldus was very skilled in typography, publishing many valuable works in the field. His typographical activity, if not reaching his grandfather's refined standards, enjoyed a high reputation of its own, to the extent that his editions were themselves prized.

Aldus died in Rome on 28 October 1597, at 50 years of age. He was working on several projects at the time of his death, including a historical and geographical description of all the Italian states and a collection of ancient inscriptions, later incorporated into the Inscriptiones antiquae of Giovanni Battista Doni published in 1731. Although he had children, none carried on the Aldine Press: with his death, the name of the Manutius family disappeared from the printing world. The vast library bequeathed to him by his father and his grandfather was dispersed. Cardinal Federico Borromeo bought part of the collection, including all the family letters. Many volumes from the Aldine library can be found today in the Biblioteca Ambrosiana in Milan.

== Works ==
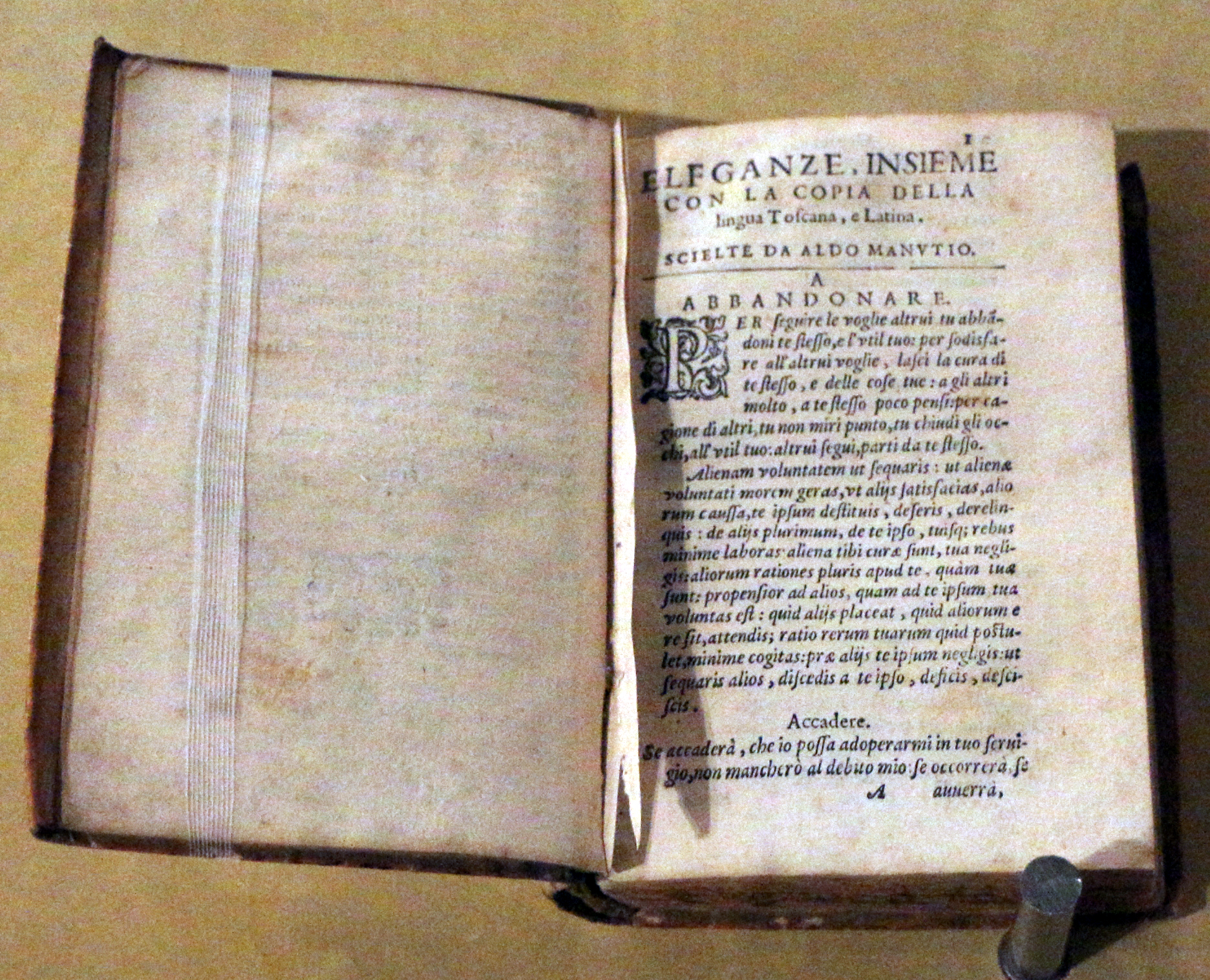
Aldo Manuzio, Eleganze della lingua Latina e toscana, Venezia, presso G.B. Bonfandino, 1588.

- Eleganze insieme con la copia della lingua toscana e latina, first published in Venice in 1588 and reissued several times in different places in Europe.
- Orthographiae ratio, collecta ex libris antiquis grammaticis, etc., Venice, 1561; second edition, revised and enlarged, Venice, 1566. An abridged version was published in Venice in 1575.
- Discorso intorno all’eccellenza delle republiche, Venice, 1572. This brief essay was reprinted without the author's name at the end of Gasparo Contarini's Della Republica e magistrati di Venetia, published in Venice in 1591.
- Locuzioni dell’epistole di Cicerone, Venice, 1575.
- De quaesitis per epistolam, libri III, Venice, 1576. This collection of essays on classical antiquity, was highly regarded by contemporary scholars. It was reprinted in the fourth volume of Gruter's Lampas, sive fax artium liberalium. Gronovius published one of the essays, De caelatura et pictura veterum, in the ninth volume of his Thesaurus antiquitatum græcarum. Graevius inserted the essays De toga, De tunica and De tibiis in the sixth volume of his Thesaurus antiquitatum romanarum.
- Oratio in funere Bernardi Rottarii, Emanuelis Philiberti ducis Sabaudiae apud Venetam remp. legati, Venice, 1578.
- Il Perfetto gentil’uomo, Venice, 1584.
- Locutioni di Terentio. Venice: Aldo. 1585.
- Vita di Cosimo de' Medici, primo gran duca di Toscana, Bologna, 1586.
- Le Attioni di Castruccio Castracane degli Antelminelli signore di Lucca, Rome, 1590. This Life of Castruccio, written by Aldus on the basis of documents he found in Lucca while on vacations from the chair at Pisa, was highly praised by de Thou.
- Lettere volgari, Rome, 1592.
- Venticinque Discorsi politici sopra Livio. Della seconda guerra Cartaginese, Rome, 1601.
- Phrases linguae latinae. Nunc primum in ordinem abecedarium adducta, et in Anglicum sermonem conversae, London, 1636.

Aldus published also commentaries on several classical texts, including the entire corpus Caesarianum and the rhetorical and philosophical works of Cicero.

== See also ==
- Paulus Manutius
- Aldus Manutius
- Aldine Press
- History of Western typography

== Bibliography ==
- Renouard, Antoine-Augustin (1834). Annales de l'imprimerie des Alde ou histoire des trois Manuces et de leurs éditions (3rd ed.). Paris.
- Sandys, John Edwin (1915). A Short History of Classical Scholarship from the Sixth Century B.C. to the Present Day. Cambridge: Cambridge University Press. p. 197.
- Willging, E. P. (2003). "Manutius". New Catholic Encyclopedia. Vol. 9: Mab-Mor (2 ed.). Detroit: Thomson Gale. pp. 129–130.
- Serrai, Alfredo (2007). La biblioteca di Aldo Manuzio il Giovane. Milan: Sylvestre Bonnard. ISBN 978-88-89609-37-8.
