= Full College =

Executive government body of the Republic of Venice

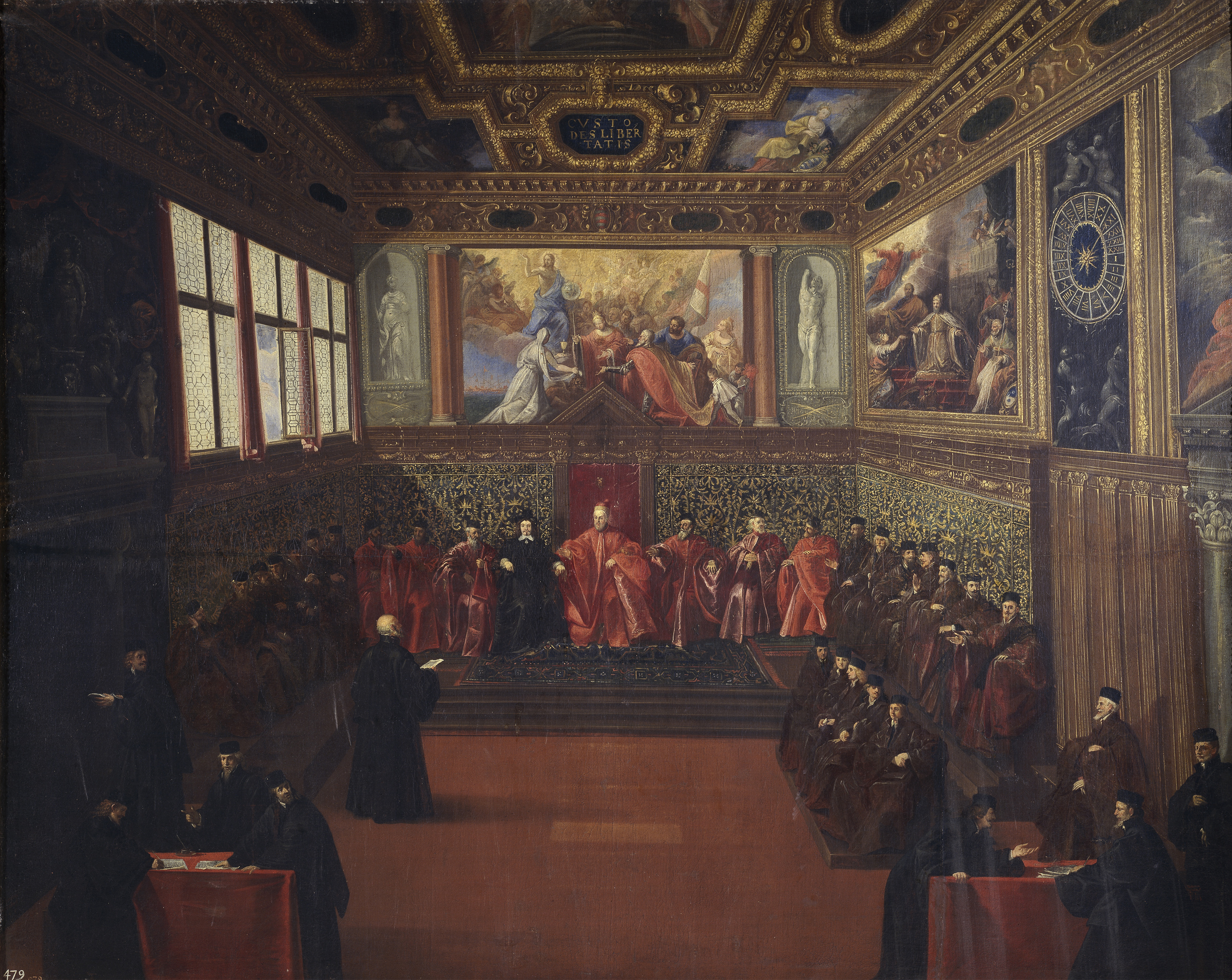
Reception of the Spanish ambassador at the "Hall of the College" (Sala del Collegio) in the Doge's Palace, 1604. Painting by Pietro Malombra

The Full College (Venetian: Pien Collegio) was the main executive body of the Republic of Venice, overseeing day-to-day governance and preparing the agenda for the Venetian Senate.

== Composition ==
The Full College comprised the Doge of Venice and the rest of the Signoria—the six ducal councillors and the three heads of the Council of Forty—as well as three sets of savi ('sages'), boards with particular responsibilities: the six Savi del Consiglio, the five Savi di Terraferma (responsible for financial and military affairs), and the Savi agli Ordini (responsible for maritime matters). As with other higher magistracies of Venice, restrictions were placed on the eligibility to the office for the savi: the members were elected from the Venetian Senate, served a term of six months, and could not be re-elected to the same office for three or six months thereafter. To ensure continuity, the appointments to the office of savio were staggered, with six-month tenures beginning on 1 October, 1 January, 1 April, and 1 July.

== Functions ==
The College met daily, under the presidency of the Doge, but with the Savi del Consiglio setting its agenda. The council read reports and dispatches, gave audience to foreign envoys, and prepared all issues to come to a vote before the Senate. On its own discretion, particularly on pressing matters of finance or foreign affairs, the College could instead send motions to be voted by the Council of Ten.

The College had the authority to dispose of public funds to the sum of 25 gold ducats in total. Along with the board of the Consultori in Iure, the College was also responsible for relations with the Church, including the reception of bishops and prelates visiting Venice. It adjudicated in matters of Church benefits and patronages, the privileges of the Republic's subject cities, and the duties of the salt tax (gabelle).

The power of the College rose from 1526 on, when it received the privilege of withholding from the Senate any acts it deemed as necessary to be kept secret. Along with the College also received the authority to issue decrees when the Senate was not in session, as well as to suspend decrees of the Great Council (provided that this measure was justified during the council's next session), by the 18th century the College became the most influential institution of the Republic.

== Sources ==
- Chambers, David Sanderson; Fletcher, Jennifer; Pullan, Brian, eds. (2001). Venice: A Documentary History, 1450-1630. University of Toronto Press. ISBN 978-0-802084248.
- Da Mosto, Andrea (1937). L'Archivio di Stato di Venezia. Indice Generale, Storico, Descrittivo ed Analitico. Tomo I: Archivi dell' Amministrazione Centrale della Repubblica Veneta e Archivi Notarili (in Italian). Rome: Biblioteca d'arte editrice. OCLC 772861816. Archived from the original on 2021-11-13.
- Lane, Frederic Chapin (1973). Venice, A Maritime Republic. Baltimore, Maryland: Johns Hopkins University Press. ISBN 0-8018-1445-6.
