= Girolamo Gamberati =

Italian painter

Girolamo Gamberati or Gamberato (1550–1628) was an Italian painter active in his native Venice.

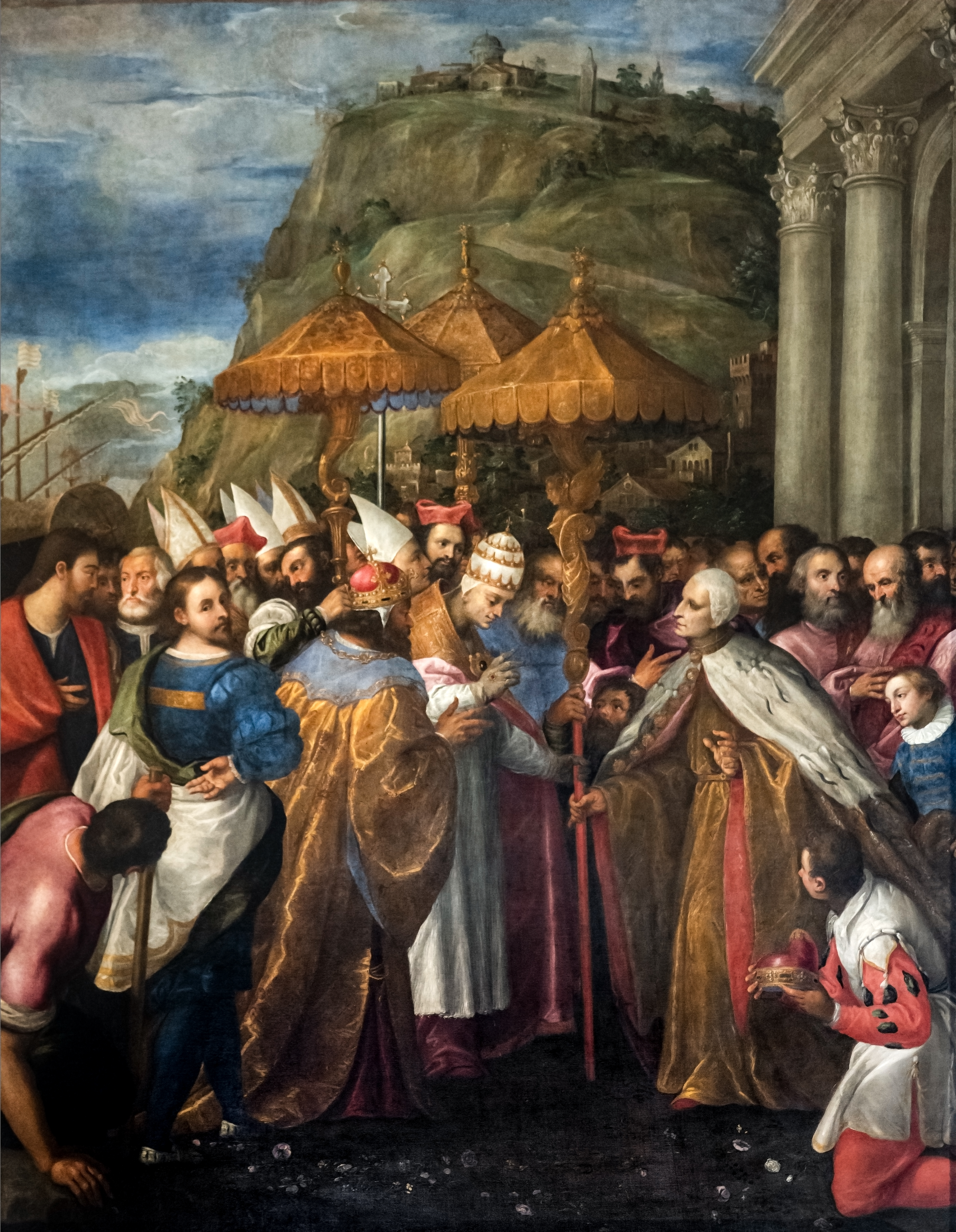
Frederick Barbarossa, the Doge Sebastiano Ziani and Pope Alexander III meet in Ancona.

== Biography ==
He learned design from Giuseppe Porta and color from Jacopo Palma il Giovane, painters with whom he collaborated on projects in the Doge's Palace. In the Sala del Maggior Consiglio, he painted an episode of the History of Ancona, placed above the door leading to the Quarantìa della Sala. It depicts a meeting in Ancona between Doge Sebastiano Ziani, Emperor Frederick Barbarossa, and Pope Alexander III, where all three were given gold umbrellas by the citizens. The pope gives his to the Doge.
