= Giuseppe Porta =

Italian painter (1520–1575)

- Born: 1520; Castelnuovo di Garfagnana
- Died: 1575 (aged 54–55); Venice
- Movement: Late Renaissance; Mannerism

Giuseppe Porta (1520–1575), also known as Giuseppe Salviati, was an Italian painter of the late-Renaissance period, active mostly in Venice.

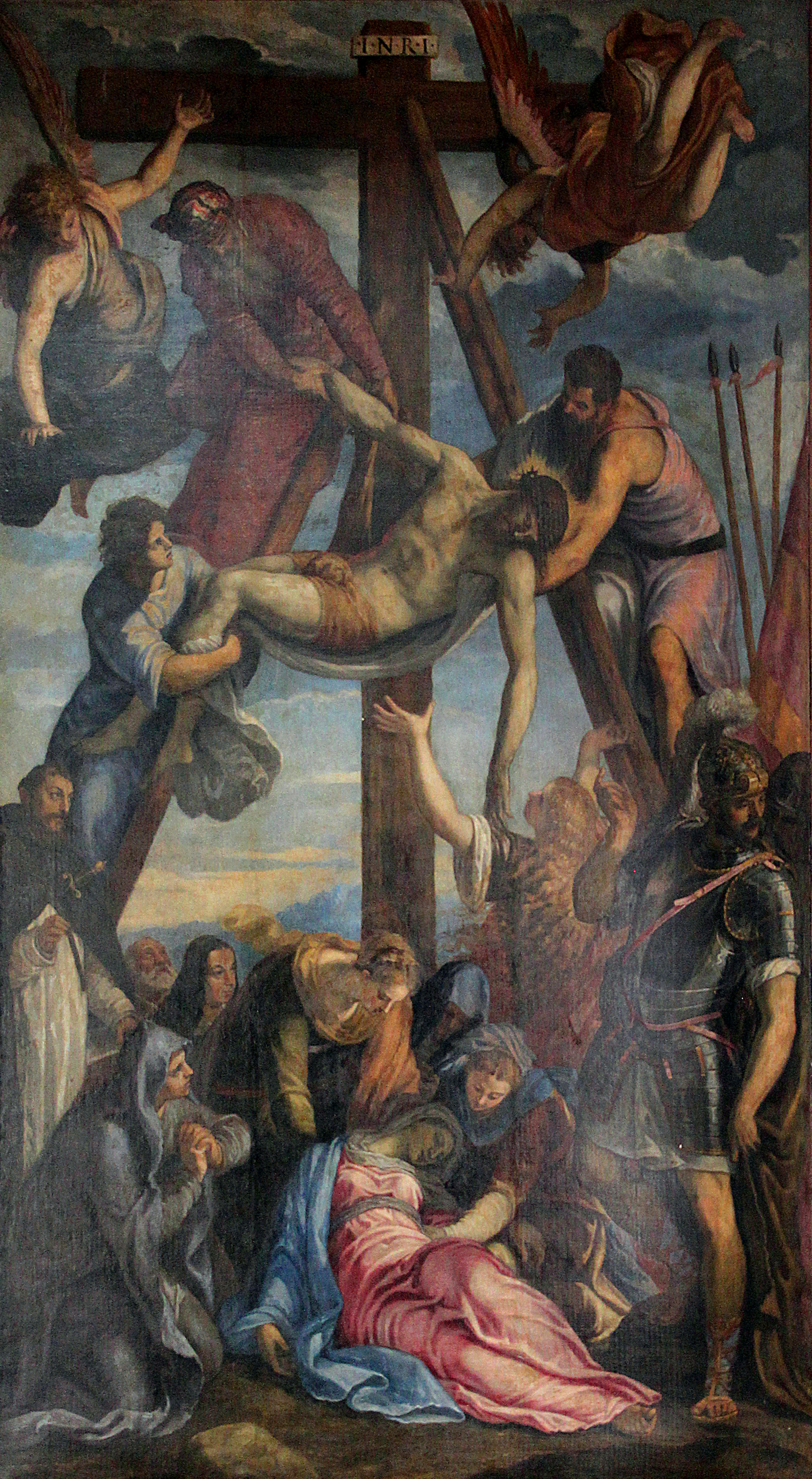
« Deposizione della Crocce », chiesa San Pietro Martire, Murano (Venice)

== Biography ==
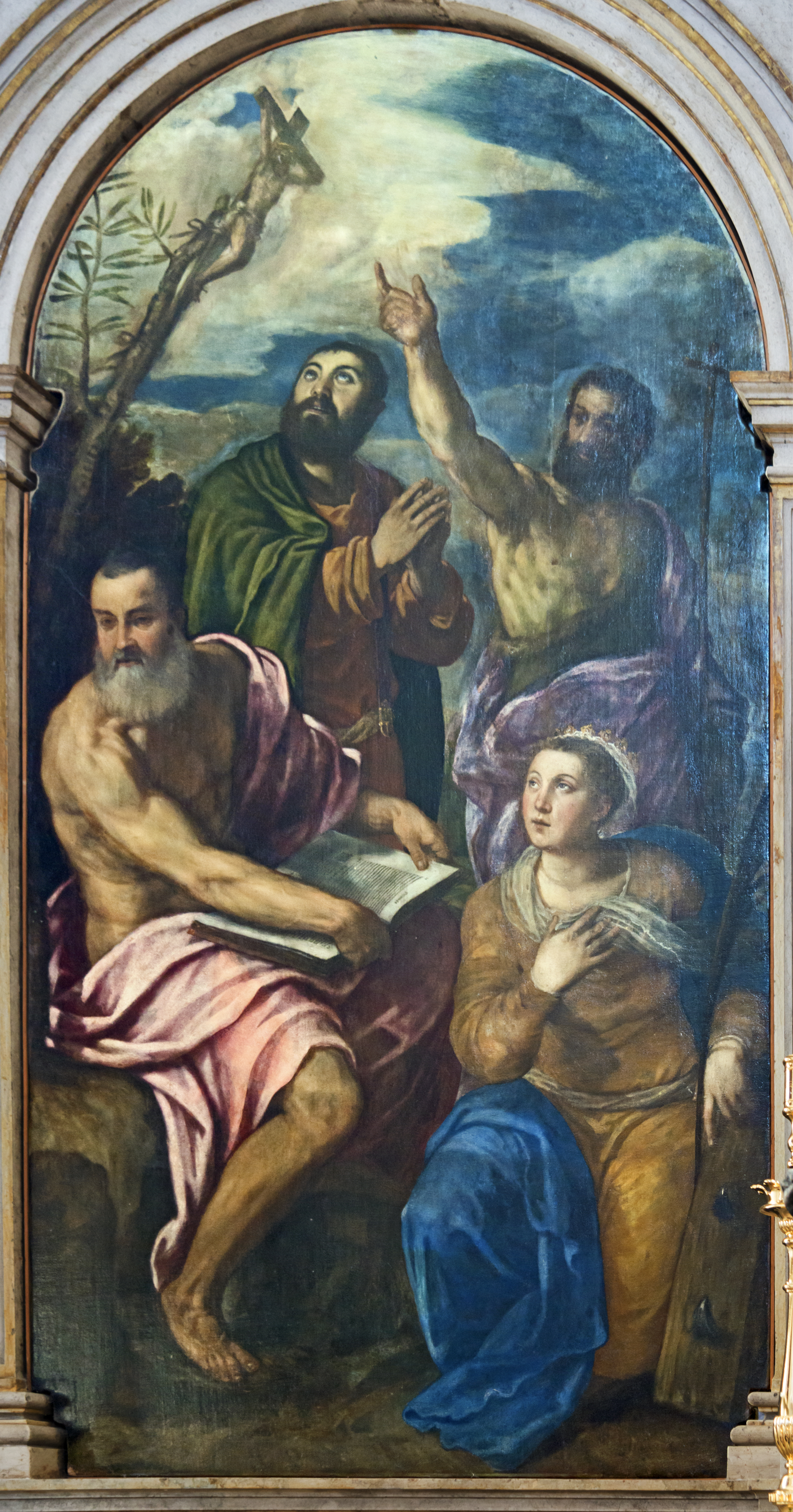
Caterina d’Alessandria con i Santi Gerolamo, Giovanni Battista, Giacomo Apostolo San Francesco della Vigna

Born in Castelnuovo di Garfagnana, in 1535 he apprenticed with Francesco Salviati in Rome. He adopted his mentor's last name when signing paintings. In 1539, he accompanied his master to Venice, and stayed there after Salviati left in 1541. From 1541 to 1552 he worked at Padua, painting in particular a series of Scenes from the Life of John the Baptist, in the Selvático Palace. In 1565, he returned to Rome to paint frescoes, left incomplete by his master: for example, (Emperor Frederick I doing homage to Alexander III) in the Vatican. He returned to Venice in 1565 to paint both in the Doge's Palace and Biblioteca Marciana, where he painted Sibyls, the Prophets, and the Cardinal Virtues; and for the chapel, the Dead Christ with his mother and Mary Magdalen. He was elected into the Florentine Accademia dell'Arte del Disegno. Much of his output was on now-lost external façade decoration. He also published a mathematically oriented treatises on decorative column design. He painted a Descent from the Cross, with the Virgin, Mary Magdalene, and St. John for the Church Degli Angeli at Murano.

Among his pupils were Pietro Malombra and Girolamo Gamberati.
