= Pietro Malombra =

Italian painter

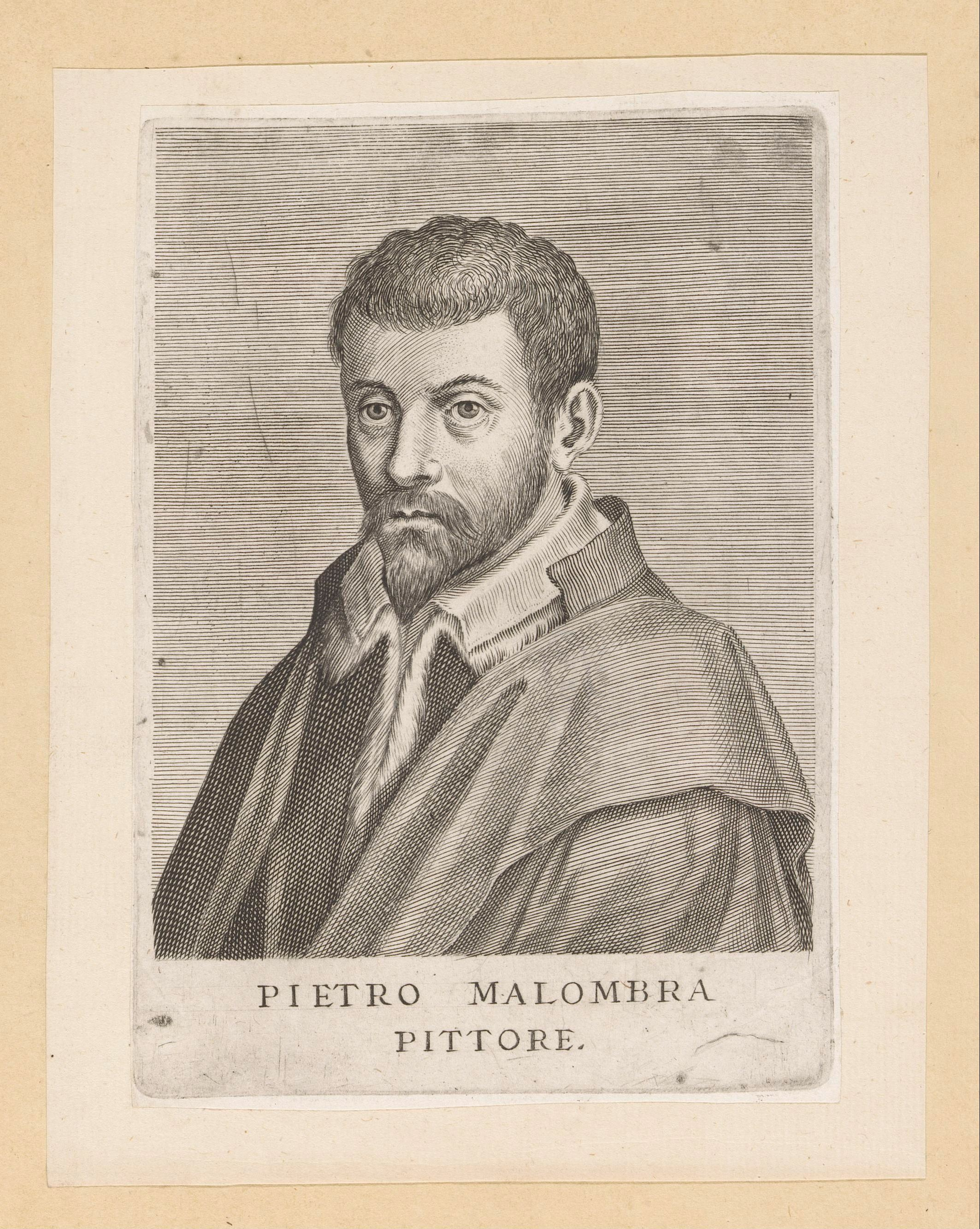
Self-portrait of Petro Malombra

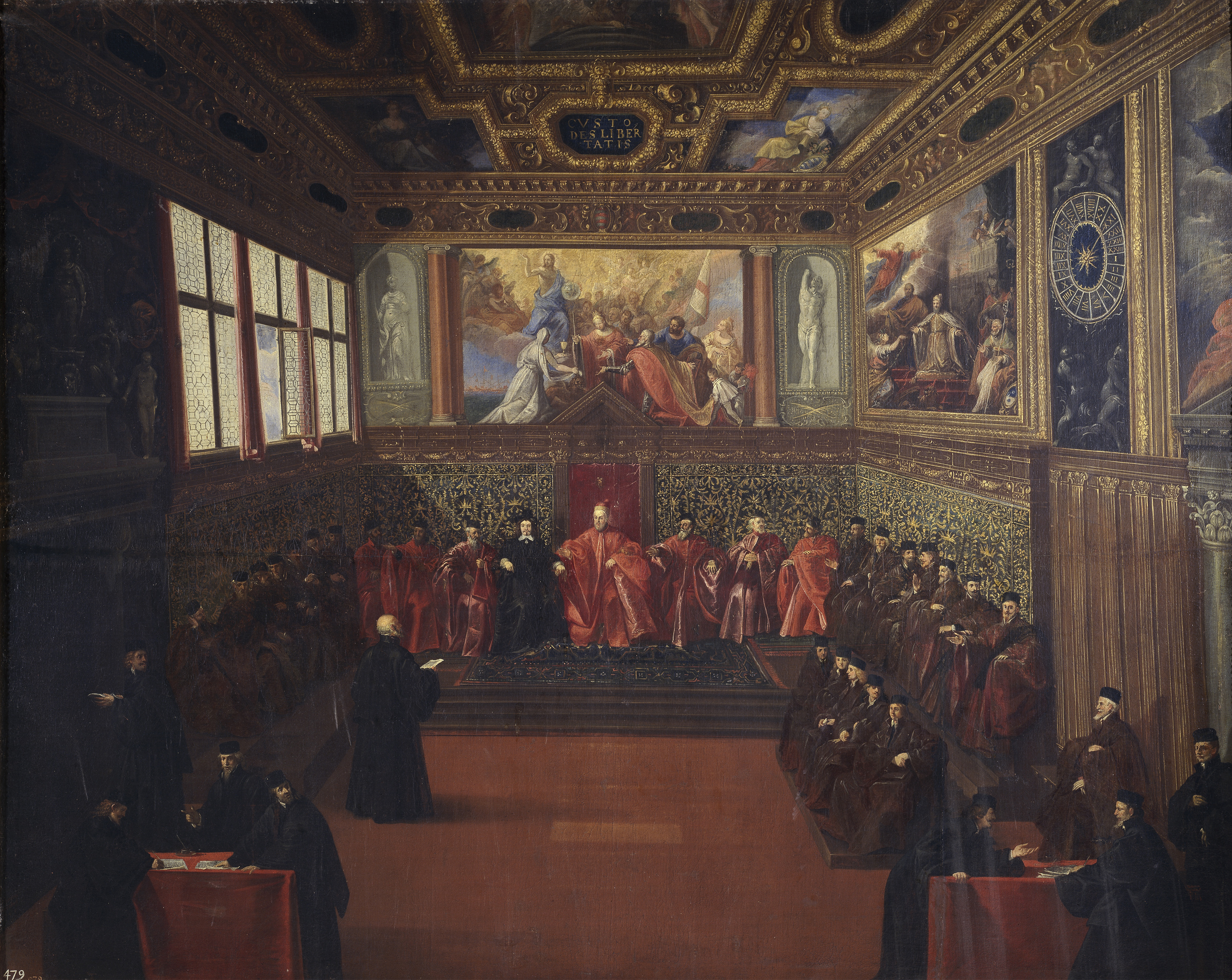
Pietro Malombra: Audience of the Spanish ambassador before the Full College in Venice, 1604. (Museo del Prado, Madrid)

Pietro Malombra (1556–1618) was an Italian painter of the late-Renaissance, active in his adoptive city of Venice. He was an educated man who became chancellor of the republic.

Malombra was born in Cremona. According to Ticozzi, he befriended and learned painting from Giuseppe Porta. He often represented events of state, but also decorated government offices and churches in Venice and Padua. He was also a poet.

He was born to a wealthy family, and initially painted for joy, but soon became impoverished, and had to paint for sustenance. He painted a number of canvases for the church of San Francesco di Paola in the sestiere of Castello in Venice. He is known for painting civic functions of the councils of Venice. He died in Venice.

His son, Giuseppe Malombra, was also a painter.
