= Savi del Consiglio =

Magistrates of the Republic of Venice

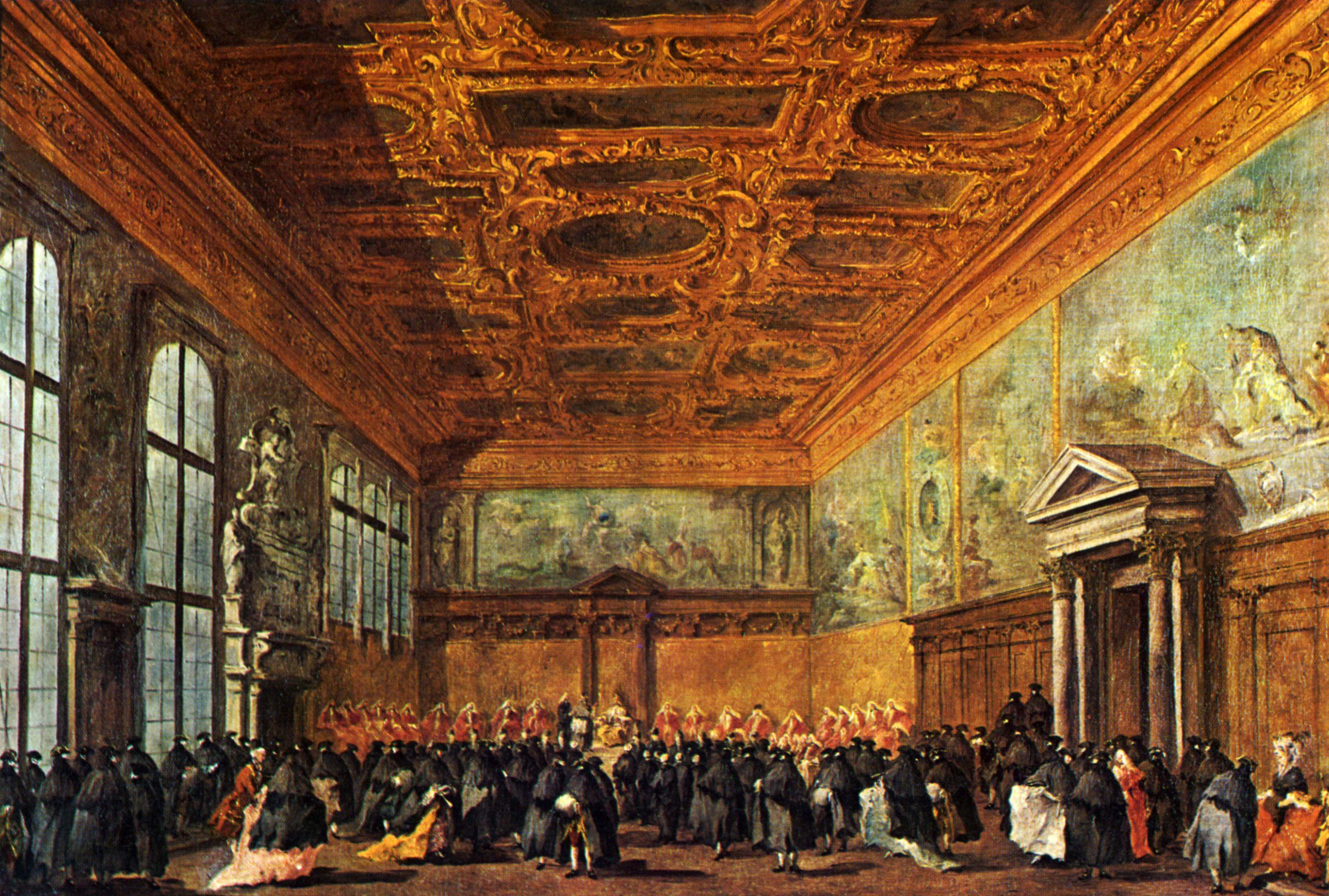

The savi del Consiglio dei Pregadi (lit. 'sages of the Council of the Invited'), also known as the savi grandi ('great sages'), were senior magistrates of the Republic of Venice.

== History ==
The magistracy was created in 1380 to assist the councils comprising the government of the Republic. The duty of the savi del Consiglio was to "prepare [the government's] agenda, frame resolutions, defend them, and supervise their execution".

Their number was not fixed in the beginning, but was eventually set at six. They were chosen from the members of the Venetian Senate, or Consiglio dei Pregadi, whence their name. As with other higher magistracies of Venice, restrictions were placed on the eligibility to the office: the members served a term of six months and could not be re-elected to the same office for six months thereafter. To ensure continuity, the appointments to the office were staggered: three took office on 1 October, three on 1 January, three on 1 April, and three on 1 July. They rotated through their duties, with savio holding office for a week. Like all boards of savi, the office did not carry a salary, but could be held in tandem with other public offices.

The savi del Consiglio were always present in, and in charge of the agenda of, the daily deliberations of the Full College (the Venetian cabinet). They were also obliged to be present in all sessions of the Council of Ten that had to do with foreign affairs. Consequently, and since no proposal could appear for vote before the Senate without having first been reviewed by the College, the savi del Consiglio came to be part of a small core of officials who exercised the most control over the governance of the Republic, alongside the Doge of Venice, the six ducal councillors, and the heads of the Ten. The post was accordingly given exclusively to the most highly regarded members of the Venetian patriciate.

== Sources ==
- Chambers, David Sanderson; Fletcher, Jennifer; Pullan, Brian, eds. (2001). Venice: A Documentary History, 1450-1630. University of Toronto Press. ISBN 978-0-802084248.
- Da Mosto, Andrea (1937). L'Archivio di Stato di Venezia. Indice Generale, Storico, Descrittivo ed Analitico. Tomo I: Archivi dell' Amministrazione Centrale della Repubblica Veneta e Archivi Notarili (in Italian). Rome: Biblioteca d'arte editrice. OCLC 772861816. Archived from the original on 2021-11-13.
- Kohl, Benjamin (2014). "The Changing Function of the Collegio in the Governance of Trecento Venice". Venice and the Veneto during the Renaissance: the Legacy of Benjamin Kohl. Firenze University Press. pp. 35–46. ISBN 9788866556633.
- Lane, Frederic Chapin (1973). Venice, A Maritime Republic. Baltimore, Maryland: Johns Hopkins University Press. ISBN 0-8018-1445-6.
