= Savi agli Ordini =

Maritime official in the Republic of Venice

The Savi[i] agli Ordini or Savi ai Ordini (lit. 'Wise Men on the Orders') were senior magistrates of the Republic of Venice, charged with supervision of maritime matters, including commerce, the Venetian navy and the Republic's oversees colonies (Stato da Màr).

== History ==
The five Savi agli Ordini were the earliest board of experts (savi, 'sages') to be established to help the leadership of the Venetian Republic—the Signoria of Venice—prepare legislation for submission to the Venetian Senate, the Council of the Forty, or the Great Council. As such, along with the other boards of savi established in the 14th/15th centuries, they sat on the Full College (Pien Collegio), the Republic's effective cabinet. In 1442, they were aggregated to the Senate, becoming ex officio members of it.

They were originally elected every November for a term of a month, simply to formulate commercial policy—on the size and destination of the trade convoys that sailed each spring—and naval policy—the outfitting of the 'guard fleet', intended for operations in the Adriatic Sea, the Aegean Sea, and the Eastern Mediterranean. By c. 1330 the Savi agli Ordini had become a fixture of the government, and their terms of office were extended to cover an entire year.

In the 15th century, as with other higher magistracies of Venice, restrictions were placed on the eligibility to the office: the members were elected by the Senate, served a term of six months, beginning on 1 April or 1 October, and could not be re-elected to the same office for six months thereafter.

Their significance declined considerably after the end of the disastrous Second Ottoman–Venetian War in 1503. The office was increasingly used as a political training position, usually given to younger and less experienced patricians than those chosen for the other boards of savi; they sat in a lower place in the hall where the Full College's sessions took place, and when the heads of the Council of Ten entered the chamber, they had to depart it. As the 16th-century political thinker Donato Giannotti put it, "their office is to be silent and listen".

Like all savi, the office did not carry a salary, but could be held in tandem with other public offices.

== Sources ==
- Brown, Horatio F. (1887). Venetian Studies. London: Kegan Paul, Trench & Co. OCLC 458907462.
- Chambers, David Sanderson; Fletcher, Jennifer; Pullan, Brian, eds. (2001). Venice: A Documentary History, 1450-1630. University of Toronto Press. ISBN 978-0-802084248.
- Da Mosto, Andrea (1937). L'Archivio di Stato di Venezia. Indice Generale, Storico, Descrittivo ed Analitico. Tomo I: Archivi dell' Amministrazione Centrale della Repubblica Veneta e Archivi Notarili (in Italian). Rome: Biblioteca d'arte editrice. OCLC 772861816. Archived from the original on 2021-11-13.
- Finlay, Robert (1980). Politics in Renaissance Venice. Ernest Benn. ISBN 978-0-5100-0085-1.
- Kohl, Benjamin G.; O'Connell, Monique (2014). "The Changing Function of the Collegio in the Governance of Trecento Venice". Venice and the Veneto during the Renaissance: the Legacy of Benjamin Kohl. Firenze University Press. pp. 35–46. ISBN 978-8-8665-5663-3.
- Lane, Frederic Chapin (1973). Venice, A Maritime Republic. Baltimore, Maryland: Johns Hopkins University Press. ISBN 0-8018-1445-6.
