= Bernardo Navagero =

Venetian ambassador and cardinal (1507–1565)

- Cardinal-Priest of San Pancrazio fuori le mura
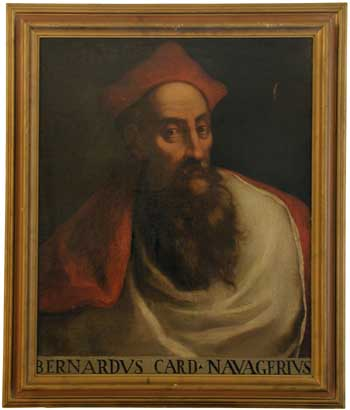
- Other posts: Bishop of Verona, 1562-65

Orders
- Created cardinal: 26 February 1561

Personal details
- Born: 1507 Venice, Republic of Venice
- Died: 13 April 1565 (aged 57–58) Verona, Republic of Venice
- Buried: Verona Cathedral
- Denomination: Roman Catholicism

Bernardo Navagero (1507 – 13 April 1565) was a Venetian ambassador and a cardinal of the Roman Catholic Church.

== Biography ==
Navagero was born in 1507, in Venice, to Gianluigi Navagero and Lucrezia Agostini. He studied at the University of Padua. He married Istriana Lando, granddaughter of the doge Pietro Lando, but she died young.

He was Venetian resident ambassador at the courts of emperor Charles V (1543–46), Suleiman the Magnificent (1550–52) and pope Paul IV (1555–58), and he attended the Council of Ten (1552).

On 26 February 1561, he was named cardinal by pope Pius IV, and he was bishop of Verona from 1562 until his death on 13 April 1565. In 1563, he was legatus a latere at the council of Trent.

He died in Verona on 13 April 1565, leaving his episcopate to his nephew Agostino Valier.
