= Savi di Terraferma =

The Savii or Savi di Terraferma (lit. 'Wise Men of the Mainland') was a board of five senior magistrates of the Republic of Venice, initially charged with the defence of the Republic's possessions in the Italian mainland (Domini di Terraferma). Gradually they assumed specific roles pertaining to the supervision of public finances (the Savio Cassier), the military administration (the Savio alla Scrittura and Savio alle Ordinanze), state ceremonies (the Savio ai Ceremoniali), and urgent ad hoc matters (the Savio ai da mò).

== Establishment ==
The Savi di Terraferma were established c. 1420, as part of the Republic's expansion into the Veneto and Lombardy, and its military confrontation with the Duchy of Milan over hegemony in northern Italy. They were probably the direct descendants of the extraordinary Savi straordinari alla guerra that were elected in 1412 for the pursuit of the war. In 1432, the Savi di Terraferma became ex officio members of the Venetian Senate.

== Composition ==
They were five in number, and sat on the Full College (Pien Collegio), the Republic's effective cabinet. As with other higher magistracies of Venice, restrictions were placed on the eligibility to the office: the members were elected from the Venetian Senate, served a term of six months, and could not be re-elected to the same office for three months thereafter. To ensure continuity, the appointments to the office of Savio di Terraferma were staggered: three took office on 1 October, two on 1 January, three on 1 April, and two on 1 July.

== Roles ==
Like all savi, the office did not carry a salary, but could be held in tandem with other public offices. The roles of each of the Savi di Terraferma were eventually regularized:

- the Savio alla Scrittura was analogous to a Minister for War. The post existed since at least 1519, and initially tasked with the payment of military salaries, but by the mid-17th century its powers had been extended to encompass all areas of military administration, apart from the supervision of the militias and those matters under the purview of ad hoc military committees staffed by patricians holding military commands, to which he acted in an advisory capacity.
- the Savio Cassier was analogous to a Finance Minister. The post existed as early as 1473, but appears to have lapsed and not revived until 1526, and abolished again in 1539–1543. The Savio supervised the fiscal officials known as camerlenghi and was responsible for public finances, including tax collection. His tenure lasted for a year (after 1543 limited to six months), but all affairs begun under his tenure remained under his purview until completed, even after leaving office.
- the Savio alle Ordinanze was responsible for the supervision of the militias (cernide). Unlike the previous two posts, there was no election specifically on this position, which was given to one of the three remaining Savi with the highest number of votes.
- the Savio ai Ceremoniali was responsible for public ceremonies.
- the Savio ai da mò was responsible for any other matter voted as urgent (da mò).

== Sources ==
- Brown, Horatio F. (1887). Venetian Studies. London: Kegan Paul, Trench & Co. OCLC 458907462.
- Chambers, David Sanderson; Fletcher, Jennifer; Pullan, Brian, eds. (2001). Venice: A Documentary History, 1450-1630. University of Toronto Press. ISBN 978-0-802084248.
- Da Mosto, Andrea (1937). L'Archivio di Stato di Venezia. Indice Generale, Storico, Descrittivo ed Analitico. Tomo I: Archivi dell' Amministrazione Centrale della Repubblica Veneta e Archivi Notarili (in Italian). Rome: Biblioteca d'arte editrice. OCLC 772861816. Archived from the original on 2021-11-13.
- Lane, Frederic Chapin (1973). Venice, A Maritime Republic. Baltimore, Maryland: Johns Hopkins University Press. ISBN 0-8018-1445-6.
