= Nuova Rivista Storica =

- Discipline: History
- Language: Italian
- Edited by: Gigliola Soldi Rondinini, Eugenio Di Rienzo

Publication details
- History: 1917–present
- Publisher: Società Editrice Dante Alighieri (Italy)
- Frequency: Quarterly

Standard abbreviations
- ISO 4: Nuova Riv. Stor.

Indexing
- ISSN: 0029-6236

Links
- Journal homepage; Online archives

Nuova Rivista Storica is a peer-reviewed academic journal published by Società Editrice Dante Alighieri. It publishes articles on Italian, European and World history.

== Editors ==
- Corrado Barbagallo (1917-1952)
- Gino Luzzatto (1952-1963)
- Giuseppe Martini (1963-1979)
- Alberto Boscolo (1980-1986)
- Gigliola Soldi Rondinini (1987- )
