= Accademia Veneziana =

Italian learned society active in Venice from 1557 to 1561

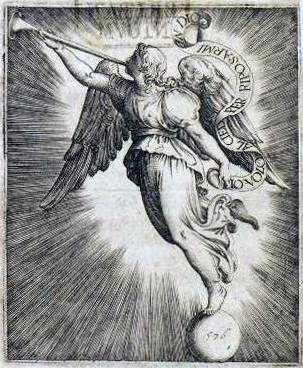
- Formation: 1557
- Dissolved: 1561
- Formerly called: Accademia della Fama; Accademia Veneta

The Accademia Veneziana was an Italian learned society active in Venice from 1557 to 1561. It was founded by Federico Badoer and shut down by the Venetian government.

It was followed by another Accademia Veneziana which was active from 1594 to 1608.

== See also ==
- List of academies of fine art in Italy
- List of learned societies in Italy
