= Venetian Senate =

Main legislative body of Venice

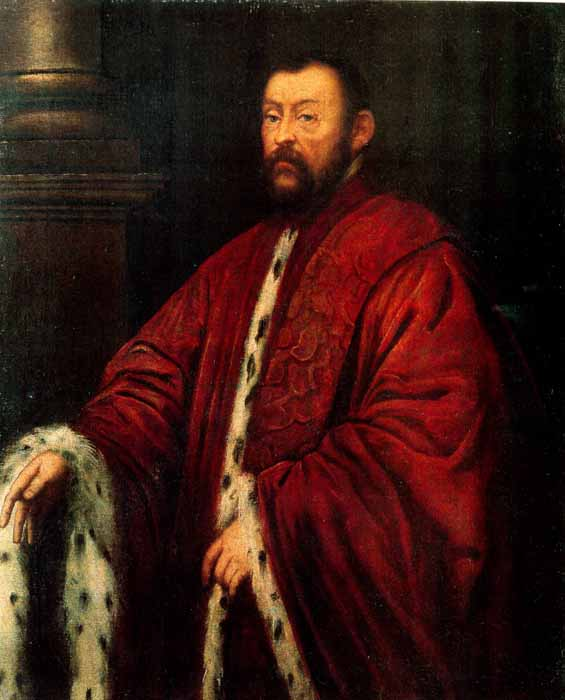
Senator Marcantonio Barbaro, 1593 painting by Tintoretto

The Senate (Venetian: Senato), formally the Consiglio dei Pregadi or Rogati (lit. 'Council of the Invited', Latin: Consilium Rogatorum), was the main deliberative and legislative body of the Republic of Venice.

== Establishment ==
The Venetian Senate was founded in 1229, or less likely shortly before that date. Its creation was both the result of the rising predominance of the aristocratic element in the Republic, and of the necessity to govern a territory that was much more extensive than the earlier Dogado and still expanding at a rapid rate. The Senate originated as a select committee of sixty men, chosen by the Great Council, to deliberate on decrees concerning taxation, commerce, foreign policy, and military operations, instead of the far larger, and more unwieldy, Great Council. Hence, it was initially named the council of the Pregadi or Rogati, while the name of 'Senate' was only applied to it in the late 14th century, under the influence of Renaissance humanism.

== Membership ==
The Senate was initially junior to another similar committee, the Council of Forty, but it quickly grew in importance. In the process, the sixty members serving annual terms were gradually joined by further groups. The Doge of Venice and the six ducal councillors were members ex officio, even after their terms of office expired. The Council of Ten belonged to the Senate at least from 1321 on, and the Forty, from 1324. In 1363, twenty adjunct members (the zonta) were added to the regular sixty members, later increased to forty (1413) and sixty (1450). Initially this was an extraordinary measure, renewed annually by decree, but in 1506 the zonta was made permanent. A series of other judicial and fiscal and provincial governors also gained ex officio admittance, starting with the Avogadori de Comùn in 1293 and continuing into the 16th century, as new offices were created. Furthermore, ambassadors and senior military commanders held an ex officio position in the Senate from the day of their election to the end of the year after their return from their post. Children and grandchildren of a Doge were admitted once they completed their 30th year in 1473, a privilege which was soon extended to a Doge's brothers as well, restricted again in 1623 to a single brother and a single son (or, in the absence of such, of a nephew), while from 1763 a Doge's two oldest sons were admitted.

Senators were not equal: some members held the right to vote on proposals (por ballotta), others to submit proposals (por parte), others held both rights, and others none. In total, about 300 men (out of an estimated 2,500 nobles in 1500) had a seat in the Senate, but only about 230 of them had a right to vote. The minimum number for a quorum was set at 70, but more usually there were about 180 nobles in attendance. Election to the Senate was for terms of one year, but frequently the same men were continuously re-elected, ensuring both experience and continuity in political decision-making.

The meetings of the Senate were presided over by the Full College, the effective executive arm of the Venetian government, which was in charge of preparing matters for discussion in the Senate through the Savi del Consiglio.

== Sources ==
- Da Mosto, Andrea (1937). L'Archivio di Stato di Venezia. Indice Generale, Storico, Descrittivo ed Analitico. Tomo I: Archivi dell' Amministrazione Centrale della Repubblica Veneta e Archivi Notarili (in Italian). Rome: Biblioteca d'arte editrice. OCLC 772861816. Archived from the original on 2021-11-13.
- Lane, Frederic Chapin (1973). Venice, A Maritime Republic. Baltimore, Maryland: Johns Hopkins University Press. ISBN 0-8018-1445-6.
