= Frederic C. Lane =

American historian (1900–1984)

- Born: November 23, 1900; Lansing, Michigan, U.S.
- Died: October 14, 1984 (aged 83)
- Education: Cornell University (BA); Tufts College (MA); Harvard University (PhD)
- Occupation: Historian
- Spouse: Harriet Whitney Mirick (m. 1927)
- Children: 3
- Parent(s): Alfred Church Lane; Susanne Foster Lauriat

Frederic C. Lane (born November 23, 1900, in Lansing, Michigan – October 14, 1984) was an American historian who specialized in Medieval history with a particular emphasis on the region of Venice.

== Early life, education, and family ==
The son of Alfred Church Lane and his wife Susanne Foster (née Lauriat) Lane, Frederic Lane received his B.A. from Cornell University in 1921, his M.A. from Tufts College in 1922, where he wrote a master's thesis on "The economic history of Europe during the first half of the sixteenth century", and his Ph.D. from Harvard University in 1930 with a doctoral thesis on "Venetian Ships and Shipbuilders of the Fifteenth and Sixteenth Centuries." He began his graduate studies at the University of Bordeaux in 1923–1924, then studied at the University of Vienna in 1924, before going to Harvard University in 1925–1926. While a Harvard graduate student he was John Thornton Kirkland Fellow for Research in Italy in 1927–1928. He married Harriet Whitney Mirick on June 4, 1927. The couple had three children, George, Jonathan and Frieda.

== Academic career ==
He was appointed instructor in history at the University of Minnesota in 1926, before being hired at The Johns Hopkins University as an instructor. There, he served as an assistant professor from 1931 to 1935. Promoted to associate professor in 1936, and full professor in 1946, he retired in 1966 as professor emeritus.

Lane's research interests focused on the Republic of Venice. His research on the city as a maritime trading center, particularly with his research in economic history, helped establish a standard for examining the development and growth of other Italian city-states. He applied his skills and interests in economic and maritime history to write the history of American wartime shipping during World War II.

From 1951 to 1954, he was assistant director at the Social Science division, Rockefeller Foundation, and advised on European policy. He served as historian of the U.S. Maritime Commission, 1946–1947. A member of the American Historical Association, he served as a member of council from 1959 to 1962, and was elected President of the American Historical Association for 1964–1965.

Active in a number of other professional organizations, he was editor of the Journal of Economic History, president of the Society for Italian Historical Studies in 1961–1963, president of the American Historical Association in 1965, president of the Economic History Association 1956–1958, and president of the International Economic History Association, 1966–1968. He was a Fellow of the American Academy of Arts and Sciences and of the Medieval Academy of America.

== Published works ==
- Venetian ships and shipbuilders of the Renaissance (1934, 1975, 1979, 1992)
- Andrea Barbarigo, merchant of Venice, 1418–1449 (1944, 1967)
- The world’s history, Frederic C. Lane with Eric F. Goldman [and] Erling M. Hunt. Drawings by Robert Velde; maps by Harold K. Faye.(1947, 1950, 1954, 1959)
- Enterprise and secular change: readings in economic history. Edited for the American Economic Association and the Economic History Association by Frederic C. Lane, editor [and] Jelle C. Riemersma, assistant editor. (1953)
- Ships for victory : a history of shipbuilding under the U.S. Maritime Commission in World War II by Frederic C. Lane; with the collaboration of Blanche D. Coll, Gerald J. Fischer, David B. Tyler; charts by Joseph T. Reynolds (1951; with a new preface by Arthur Donovan, 2001).
- Navires et constructeurs à Venise pendant la Renaissance (Paris, 1965)
- Venice and History: The Collected Papers of Frederic C. Lane, edited by a committee of colleagues and former students. Foreword by Fernand Braudel (1966)
- Studies in Venetian social and economic history by Frederic C. Lane; edited by Benjamin G. Kohl and Reinhold C. Mueller (1987).
- Venice, a Maritime Republic, 1973, The Johns Hopkins University Press, Longitude Books
- Profits from power : readings in protection rent and violence-controlling enterprises (1979)
- Money and Banking in Medieval and Renaissance Venice vol. 1, Coins and moneys of account by Frederic C. Lane and Reinhold C. Mueller (1985); vol. 2, The Venetian money market: banks, panics, and the public debt, 1200–1500 by Reinhold C. Mueller (1997).

== Recognition ==
International recognition of his scholarship included:

- The Journal of Economic History dedicated its December 1980 edition to him on the occasion of his 80th birthday.
- In 1980 he received the International Galileo Galilei Prize, awarded annually to a non-Italian scholar for notable contributions to Italian culture and history.
- In 1984 he was awarded the International Prize of the Francesco Saverio Nitti Foundation.

== See also ==
- Gino Luzzatto
