= 1300 =

1300 in various calendars
- Gregorian calendar: 1300; MCCC
- Ab urbe condita: 2053
- Armenian calendar: 749; ԹՎ ՉԽԹ
- Assyrian calendar: 6050
- Balinese saka calendar: 1221–1222
- Bengali calendar: 706–707
- Berber calendar: 2250
- English Regnal year: 28 Edw. 1 – 29 Edw. 1
- Buddhist calendar: 1844
- Burmese calendar: 662
- Byzantine calendar: 6808–6809
- Chinese calendar: 己亥年 (Earth Pig); 3997 or 3790 — to — 庚子年 (Metal Rat); 3998 or 3791
- Coptic calendar: 1016–1017
- Discordian calendar: 2466
- Ethiopian calendar: 1292–1293
- Hebrew calendar: 5060–5061
- Hindu calendars
- Vikram Samvat: 1356–1357
- Shaka Samvat: 1221–1222
- Kali Yuga: 4400–4401
- Holocene calendar: 11300
- Igbo calendar: 300–301
- Iranian calendar: 678–679
- Islamic calendar: 699–700
- Japanese calendar: Shōan 2 (正安２年)
- Javanese calendar: 1211–1212
- Julian calendar: 1300; MCCC
- Korean calendar: 3633
- Minguo calendar: 612 before ROC 民前612年
- Nanakshahi calendar: −168
- Thai solar calendar: 1842–1843
- Tibetan calendar: ས་མོ་ཕག་ལོ་ (female Earth-Boar); 1426 or 1045 or 273 — to — ལྕགས་ཕོ་བྱི་བ་ལོ་ (male Iron-Rat); 1427 or 1046 or 274

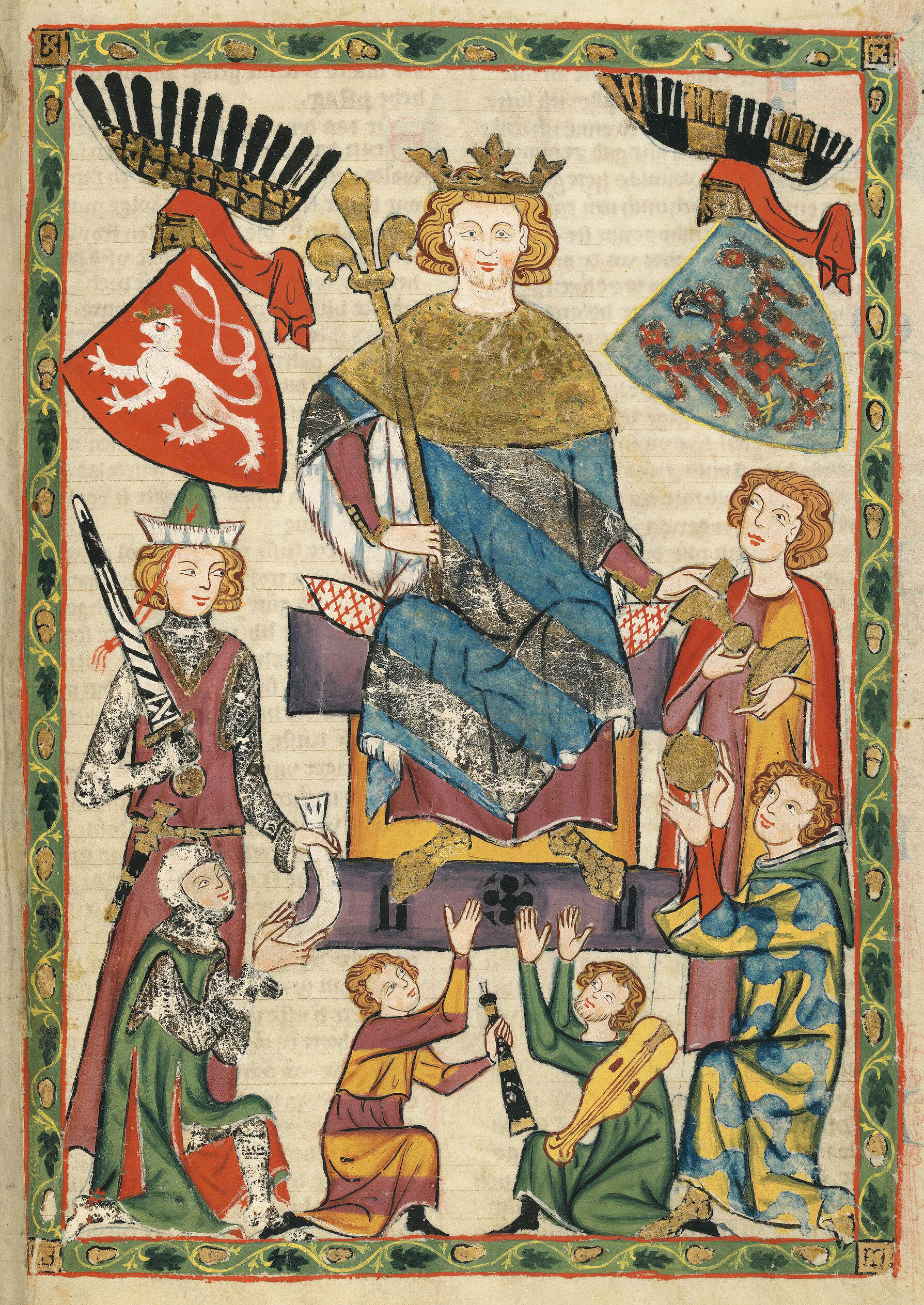
King Wenceslaus II, crowned King of Poland in 1300, from the Codex Manesse (14th century)

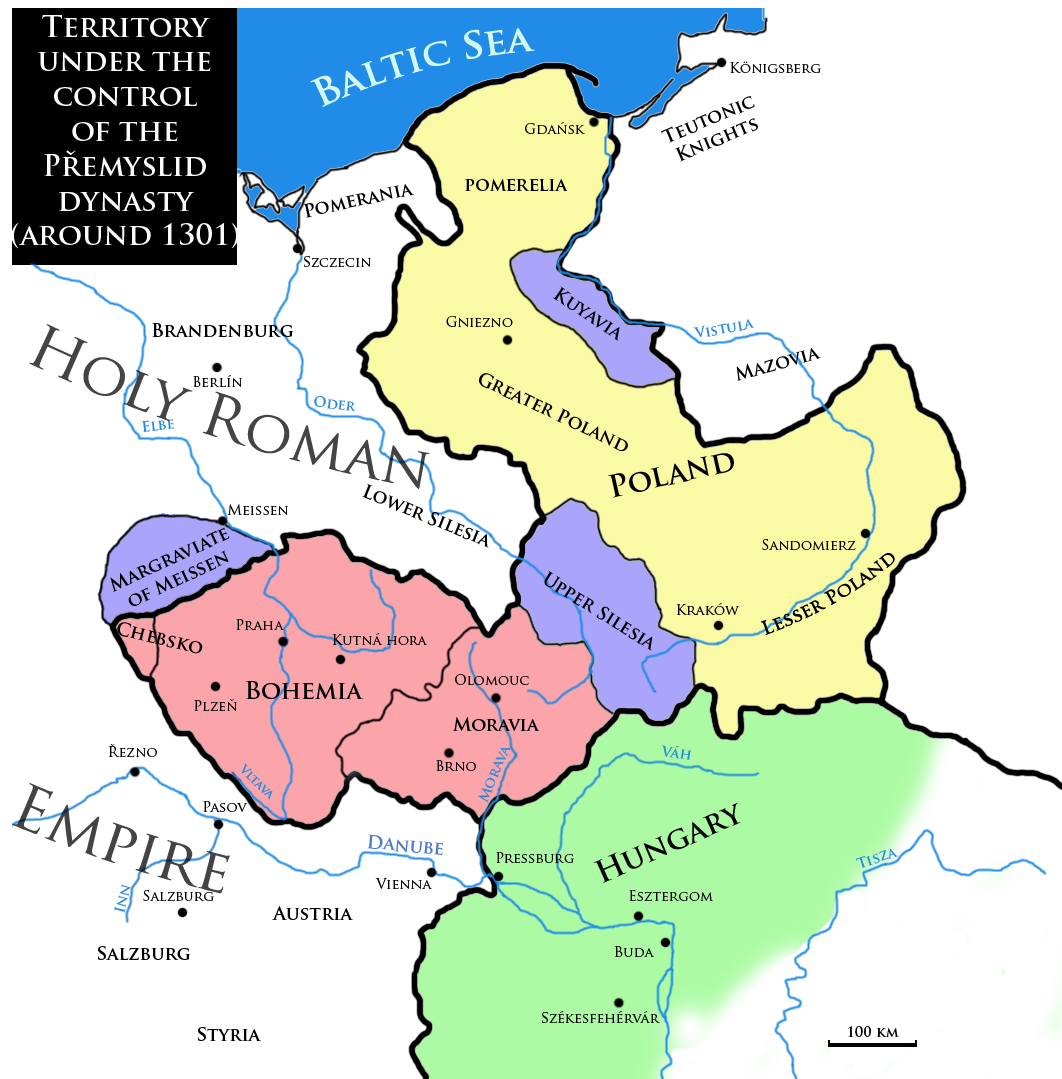
Territory under control of Wenceslaus II of the Přemyslid dynasty (c. 1301)

The year 1300 (MCCC) was a leap year starting on Friday in the Julian calendar. It was the last year of the 13th century, and the first year of the 14th century. The year 1300 was not a leap year in the Proleptic Gregorian calendar.

== January – March ==
- January 6 – In the Middle East, Mahmud Ghazan, designated by the Mongol Empire to be the Ilkhanate ruler of what is now Iran, completes the conquest of Damascus.
- January 17 – The marriage of Eleanor of Anjou, daughter of King Charles II of Naples, to Philippe II de Toucy is annulled by Pope Boniface VIII because neither husband nor wife is more than 10 years old and their parents have not sought permission from the Pope to approve the marriage. The dissolution clears the way for Eleanor to marry again, and she will wed Frederick III of Sicily on May 17, 1302, to become queen consort of the Italian island kingdom.
- January 22 – In the Himalayan Mountains kingdom of Nepal, armies from Mithila capture Bhadagon and occupy the area until the ruling house of Tripura withdraws.
- February 14 – Egyptian monk Yohanna Ben-Ebsal is ordained as the 80th Pope of the Coptic Orthodox Church and takes the regnal name Pope John VIII, following the death on January 13 of Theodosios III.
- February 22 – Pope Boniface VIII begins the practice of Roman pontiffs declaring a Jubilee or "Holy Year" to be observed every 100 years, and issues the papal bull Antiquorum habet fida relatio. Boniface declares that Christians who make a pilgrimage to visit Saint Peter's Basilica will receive a plenary indulgence forgiving them from purgatorial punishment for certain sins. The papal declaration, which also applies to a visit to the Basilica of Saint Paul, results in tens of thousands of people visiting Rome during the Jubilee Year. It is at this celebration that Giovanni Villani decides to write his universal history of Florence, called the Nuova Cronica ("New Chronicles").
- March 6 – King Edward I of England ("Longshanks") convenes his 47th meeting of parliament in 25 years at Westminster for a two week session. Before dissolving on March 20, the parliament approves the articuli super cartas, a 20-article amendment to the original Magna Carta.
- March 22 – Shortly after a failed coup d'état attempt by Marin Bocconio, the Republic of Venice makes major reforms of its Quarantia (from Consiglio dei Quranta or "Council of Forty"), the 40 nobles allowed to elect the Republic's chief executive (the Doge of Venice) and the members of its legislative body, the Mazor Consegio. The change in law requires at least 20 votes by the 40 electors to be added to the Consegio, which has grown to 1,100 members.
- March – Franco–Flemish War: King Philip IV ("Philip the Fair") begins to invade Flanders again after the expiration of an armistice in January. French forces plunder and devastate the countryside around Ypres. The king's brother, Charles of Valois, marches from Bruges to the outskirts of Ghent. He burns Nevele and twelve other towns. In March, French forces besiege Damme and Ypres.

== April – June ==
- April 30 – Thomas of Corbridge consecrated by Pope Boniface VIII as Archbishop of York on February 28, is given use by the Pope of the income from all of the possessions of the Roman Catholic Church in the ecclesiastical province of York, covering all of the northern counties of England from Nottingham to the Scottish border.
- April – Franco–Flemish War: At the end of April, Damme, Aardenburg and Sluis surrender.
- May 8 – Franco-Flemish War: In Flanders (part of modern-day Belgium), the city of Ghent surrenders. By the time that Ypres surrenders on May 21, all of Flanders has been conquered. By the end of the month, all of Flanders is under French control, and several Flemish nobles (like Guy of Namur) are taken into captivity in France.
- May 10 – A session of the Parliament of Scotland is held at Rutherglen. Sir Ingram de Umfraville replaces Sir Robert the Bruce as one of the three members of the Guardians of the Kingdom of Scotland, a group of regents who govern Scotland during the "Second Interregnum", a period when King Edward I of England is threatening to annex Scotland. Umfraville joins Baron John Comyn III of Badenoch and Bishop William de Lamberton, but the three step down the following year to make way for a single Guardian, John de Soules. Robert the Bruce later becomes King of Scotland in 1306.
- May 25 – Rudolf III, the Habsburg Duke of Austria since 1298, marries the eldest daughter of King Philip III of France, Princess Blanche. The couple remain married until her death on March 1, 1305.
- May – After the destruction of Aleppo and withdrawal of the Mongol Empire troops of Khan Ghazan, the Mamluks return to the Middle East from Egypt.
- June 15 – In Spain, Diego López V de Haro, Spanish nobleman and Lord of Biscay, founds the city of Bilbao through a municipal charter in Valladolid.
- June 17 – In Finland, Turku Cathedral is consecrated by Bishop Magnus I at Turku. During his reign, he helps to complete the Christianization in Finland.
- June 24 – English invasion of Scotland (1300): On Midsummer Day, after crossing the border from England into Scotland, England's King Edward I holds a conference at English-occupied Scottish territory at Roxburgh with his advance force. King Edward starts another Scottish campaign and marches north with his army, accompanied by several knights of Brittany and Lorraine. The 16-year-old Prince Edward of Caernarfon is appointed to take command of the rearguard of the English army but part from a small skirmish, he sees no action.
- June 26 – English invasion of Scotland (1300): The largest part of the English Army marches from Carlisle to renezvous with King Edward I at Caerlaverock Castle.

== July – September ==
- July 10 – English invasion of Scotland (1300): King Edward I of England begins a five-day siege of Caerlaverock Castle in Scotland. Enraged by the defending garrison's request for honorable surrender terms, Edward orders the destruction of the castle with battering rams and stone-lobbing trebuchet catapults, then pulls down the walls of the garrison.
- July 17 – English invasion of Scotland (1300): King Edward I and the English Army arrive in Galloway and set up camp on July 19 at Kirkcudbright where they remain for 10 days while laying waste to the surrounding country side. They confront a Scottish army under John Comyn III ("the Red") on the River Cree. During the battle, the Scottish cavalry is again defeated. Edward is unable to pursue the fugitives into the wild country, where they flee and take refuge. John escapes with his life and begins to raid the English countryside in smaller groups.
- July 18 – Gerard Segarelli, Italian founder of the Apostolic Brethren, is burned at the stake in Parma during a brutal repression of the Apostolics.
- July 20 – A fleet of 16 ships led by Jacques de Molay (Grand Master of the Knights Templar), Henry II of Cyprus (the last European King of Jerusalem), Amalric of Tyre, and an emissary of the Mongol leader Ghazan departs from the Cyprus port of Famagusta and begins a raid of Muslim-occupied cities in Egypt and Palestine before returning to Cyprus.
- July 25 – Wenceslaus II, King of Bohemia, of the Czech Přemyslid dynasty, is crowned King of Poland in a ceremony at Gniezno, near Poznań, after his Bohemian forces have seized Pomerania and Greater Poland (Wielkopolska). The 28-year-old Wenceslaus has ruled Lesser Poland (Małopolska) since 1291, and forced a number of Silesian princes to swear allegiance to him. Crowned as king, he reunites the Polish territories and during his reign introduces a number of laws and reforms, the most important being the creation of a new type of official known as a starosta (or "Elder"), who rules a small territory as the king's direct representative.
- August 9 – After crossing the River Dee in Scotland and reaching Twynholm, King Edward I and his English troops receive new provisions from the English Navy and fights a brief skirmish with the Scots.
- August 27 – Robert Winchelsey, the Archbishop of Canterbury, arrives at Sweetheart Abbey in Scotland with the papal envoy Lumbardus, to deliver a letter from Boniface VIII to England's King Edward I demanding that Edward withdraw from the Kingdom of Scotland. Edward ignores the letter, but because the campaign is not a success, the English forces begin on their home journey and Edward arranges a truce.
- September 20 – Italian diplomat Isol the Pisan (Ciolo Bofeti di Anastasio) is appointed by Pope Boniface VIII to be the Church's liaison between the European settlements in the Middle East (the Crusader states) and the Mongol Empire, and given the title "Vicar of Syria and the Holy Land for Ghazan the Emperor of the Tartars".
- September 26 – King Edward I summons the English Parliament to Lincoln. The parliamentary session will last until January 30, 1301.

== October – December ==
- October 28 (13 Safar 700 AH) – After learning that the Mongol Empire plans to stage a new attack on the Middle East, including what is now the area occupied by Syria, Egypt, Jordan, Lebanon and Palestine, the Mamluk Sultan, Nasir ad-Din Muhammad, leads an army from Cairo to confront the invasion.
- October 30 – At Dumfries, a truce is concluded between England and Scotland after being mediated by France and both sides agree to a cease hostilities until Whitsunday (May 21) of 1301. King Edward then returns to England.
- November 11 – King Edward I holds a session of the English parliament at York, then remains there until shortly after Christmas.
- December 30 (17 Rabi II 700 AH) – Mahmud Ghazan, ruler of the Mongol Empire's Ikhanate area in the Middle East, crosses the Euphrates River at Qala'at Jabar (modern-day Raqqa in Syria) to invade Syria. Residents of Damascus, Aleppo and other areas of Syria, fearing a repeat of the massacre a few months earlier, flee toward Gaza. Ghazan turns back less than five weeks later because of unusually cold weather (including heavy snow and rain) that kills almost all of his cavalry's 12,000 horses.

== Undated ==
- In "Oasisamerica", the modern-day southwestern United States, the Ancestral Puebloans abandon the Mesa Verde region in the Colorado Plateau.

== Births ==
- January 21 – Roger Clifford, English nobleman and knight (d. 1322)
- January 28 – Chūgan Engetsu, Japanese poet and writer (d. 1375)
- February 1 – Bolko II of Ziębice, Polish nobleman and knight (d. 1341)
- April 4 – Constance of Aragon, Aragonese princess (infanta) (d. 1327)
- June 1 – Thomas of Brotherton, English nobleman and prince (d. 1338)
- September 27 – Adolf of the Rhine, German nobleman (d. 1327)
- October 9 – John de Grey, English nobleman and knight (d. 1359)
- December 22 – Khutughtu Khan Kusala, Mongol emperor (d. 1329)
- Charles d'Artois, Neapolitan nobleman, knight and chancellor (d. 1346)
- Dionigi di Borgo San Sepolcro, Italian bishop and theologian (d. 1342)
- Gerard III, Dutch nobleman, knight, bailiff and rebel leader (d. 1358)
- Guillaume de Harsigny, French doctor and court physician (d. 1393)
- Guillaume de Machaut, French priest, poet and composer (d. 1377)
- Immanuel Bonfils, French mathematician and astronomer (d. 1377)
- Jakov of Serres, Serbian scholar, hierarch and translator (d. 1365)
- Jeanne de Clisson, French noblewoman and privateer (d. 1359)
- Joanna of Pfirt, German noblewoman (House of Habsburg) (d. 1351)
- Johannes Tauler, German preacher, mystic and theologian (d. 1361)
- John III, Brabantian nobleman and knight (House of Reginar) (d. 1355)
- John Sheppey, English administrator, treasurer and bishop (d. 1360)
- Jordan of Quedlinburg, German preacher, hermit and writer (d. 1380)
- Richard FitzRalph, Norman-Irish archbishop and theologian (d. 1360)
- Simon Locard (or Lockhart), Scottish landowner and knight (d. 1371)
- Thomas Bradwardine, English archbishop and theologian (d. 1349)

== Deaths ==
- January 14 – Isabella of Lusignan, French noblewoman (b. 1224)
- February 19 – Munio of Zamora, Spanish friar and bishop (b. 1237)
- July 18 – Gerard Segarelli, Italian founder of the Apostolic Brethren
- September 24 – Edmund, 2nd Earl of Cornwall, English nobleman (b. 1249)
- September 29 – Juliana FitzGerald, Lady of Thomond, Norman noblewoman (b. 1263)
- December 12 – Bartolo da San Gimignano, Italian priest (b. 1228)
- Albert III, Margrave of Brandenburg-Salzwedel, German nobleman, knight and co-ruler (House of Ascania)
- Albertus de Chiavari, Italian priest, Master General and philosopher
- Berengaria of Castile, Lady of Guadalajara, Spanish noblewoman and princess (b. 1253)
- Demetrios Pepagomenos, Byzantine physician, scientist and writer
- Geoffrey de Mowbray, Scottish nobleman, knight and Chief Justiciar
- Guido Cavalcanti, Italian poet and friend of Dante Alighieri (b. 1250)
- Güneri of Karaman, Turkish nobleman (bey) (House of Karamanid)
- Herman VIII, Margrave of Baden-Pforzheim, German nobleman and co-ruler (House of Zähringen)
- Jeanne de Montfort de Chambéon, Swiss noblewoman and regent
- Kangan Giin, Japanese Buddhist scholar and Zen Master (b. 1217)
- Thomas de Somerville, Scottish nobleman and rebel leader (b. 1245)
- Trần Hưng Đạo, Vietnamese Grand Prince and statesman (b. 1228)
- Guillaume de Nangis, French monk, chronicler and historian (b. 1250)
