= Commune of Venice =

Republic of Venice government 1143–1423

The Commune of Venice (Latin: Commune Veneciarum) is the title with which the government of the city of Venice and its Republic was designated from 1143. The municipality, similar to other medieval municipalities, was based on the popular power of the assembly, called Concio in Venice. It represented the patriciate of the city with a system of assemblies including the Great Council, Minor Council, Senate and the Council of Forty.

== Overview ==
Unlike other Italian cities, Venice retained some vestiges of their previous institution of the monarchy embodied by the Doge for setting bounds for power that such assemblies were developing. The leading groups of most of the towns gathered at the time around the core of the ancient patrician families, creating a new merchant aristocracy with the Serrata del Maggior Consiglio of 1297 and actually took over the power and ousting the popular assembly.

In the name of the Commune, it continued to operate the highest representative body of the state's sovereignty – including the Doge, the Minor Council and heads of the Forty – until 1423. At this time, the abolition of the Concione ended the last residue of municipal institutions and the supreme body took the name of Serenissima Signoria.

== See also ==
- Medieval commune
- Italian city-states
- Venetian nobility
