= Corno ducale =

Headgear and symbol of the Doge of Venice

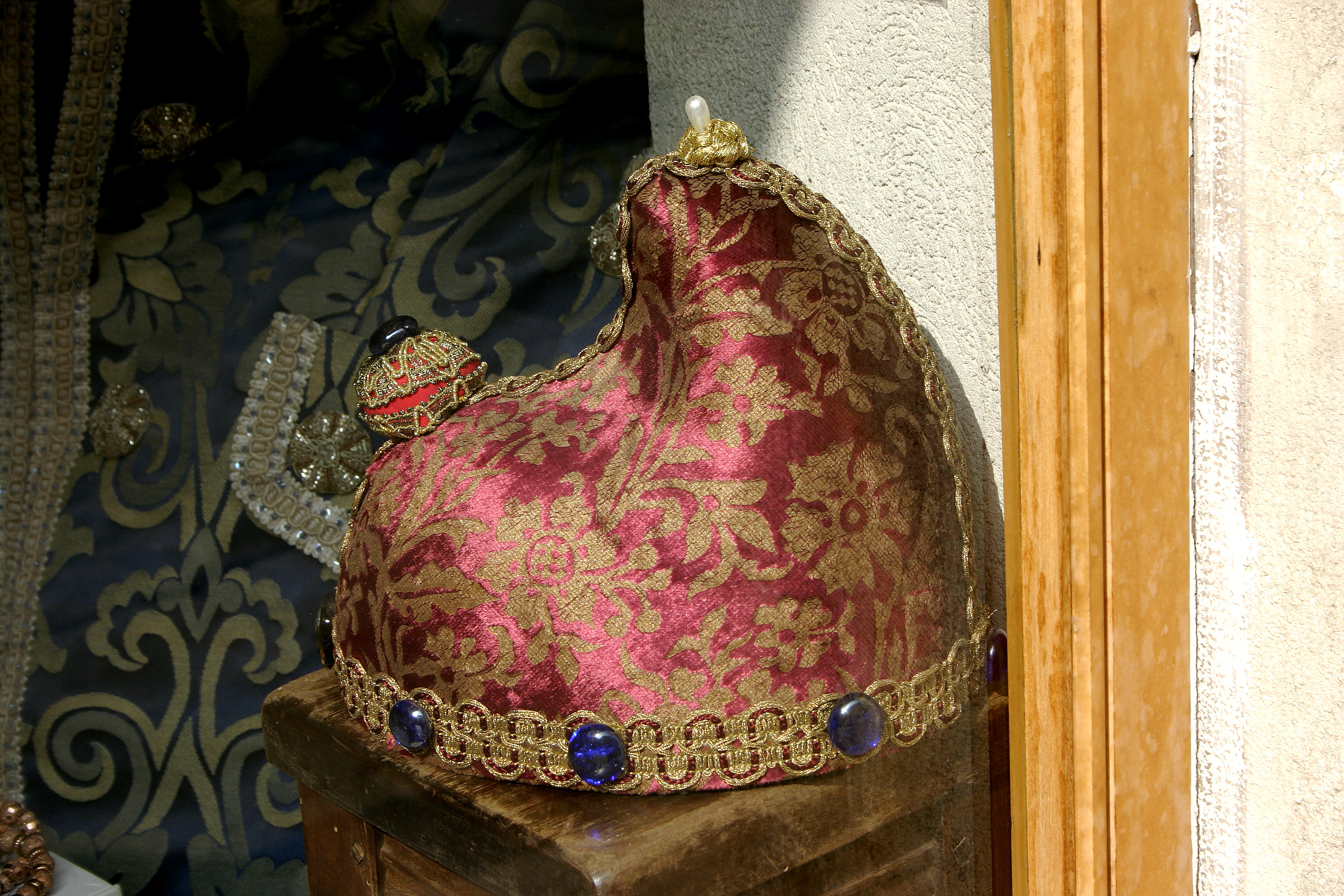

Heraldic depictions

Details
- Country: Most Serene Republic of Venice

The corno ducale (Italian for 'ducal horn'), a unique ducal hat, was the headgear and symbol of the Doge of Venice. It was a stiff horn-like bonnet, which was made of gemmed brocade or cloth-of-gold and worn over a camauro. The ducal horn was a fine linen cap with a structured peak at the back reminiscent of the Phrygian cap, a classical symbol of liberty.

Every Easter Monday, the doge headed a procession from St. Mark's basilica to the convent of San Zaccaria, where the abbess presented him with a new camauro crafted by the nuns.

== Origins ==
The origin of the design is uncertain. Venice was heavily influenced by the Orient through trade and cultural exchange. This ceremonial headdress shares similarities with the Phrygian cap or the white crown of Upper Egypt. When Venice was still part of the Eastern Roman (Byzantine) Empire, high-ranking Byzantine soldiers stationed in Venice also wore a headdress reminiscent of the horned Phrygian cap. The first recorded mention of the corno is from the 12th century, although it is possible that the doges already wore similar hats before then.

== Heraldry ==
In heraldry, a distinction is made between the doge hat of the Republic of Venice and the doge hat of the Republic of Genoa. From the end of the 18th century, this emblem of rank and dignity was only occasionally carried on in the arms of Venetian noble families (Vendramin, Sagredo, Giustiniani).

The corno was also used as a crest on the coat of arms of the Doge.

Due to a special Italian Presidential decree, the coat of arms of the modern-day city of Venice features the corno. It replaces the mural crown that is present on the coat of arms of other Italian cities.

Coat of arms of the Republic.

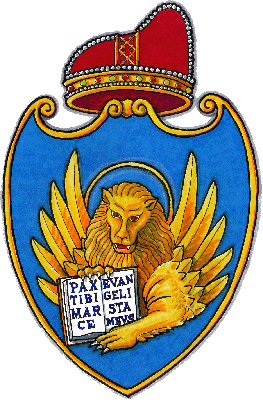
Modern-day coat of arms of the city of Venice.

== Election ==
The Venetian Doges were appointed for life by the city-state's aristocracy. The hat was presented to the doge on the day of his election. It was placed on his head by the youngest member of the Great Council, with the following formula: Accipe coronam ducalem Ducatus Venetiarum ("Receive the ducal crown of the Dogeship of Venice"). The doge then wears this horned cap in all circumstances where the dignity and power of the Republic are expressed, in particular on Easter Sunday and forty days later on the Feast of the Ascension, for the Marriage of the Sea ritual.

== History ==
Due to its particular shape, the corno ducale is a very recognisable symbol of the Most Serene Republic. The cap is featured in countless works of art.

In the Venetian language, the ducal horn is called zoia, literally "jewel". The rear point in the shape of a curved horn giving the cap its name is mentioned in the 13th century during the reign of Reniero Zeno (r. 1253–1268). In this description the headdress is made of crimson velvet, with a gold circlet around its brim. A golden cross is added to it by the doge Lorenzo Celsi (r. 1361–1365). Another transformation of the zoia occurs in the 15th century when the doge Nicolo Marcello (r. 1473–1474) had one made in gold.

The horn ceased to be used along with the office of doge in 1797, after the capture of Venice by Napoleon Bonaparte and the abdication of Ludovico Manin, the last doge.

== Gallery ==
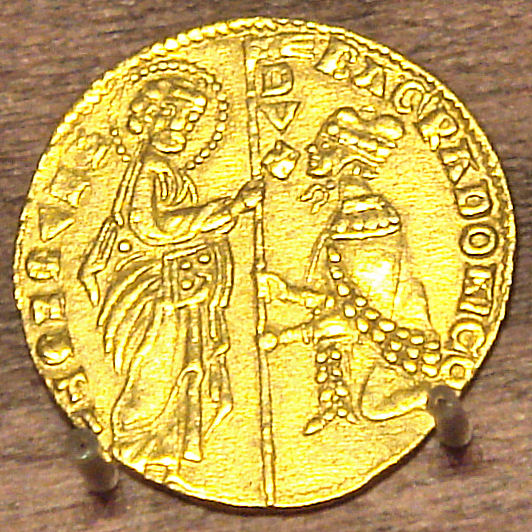

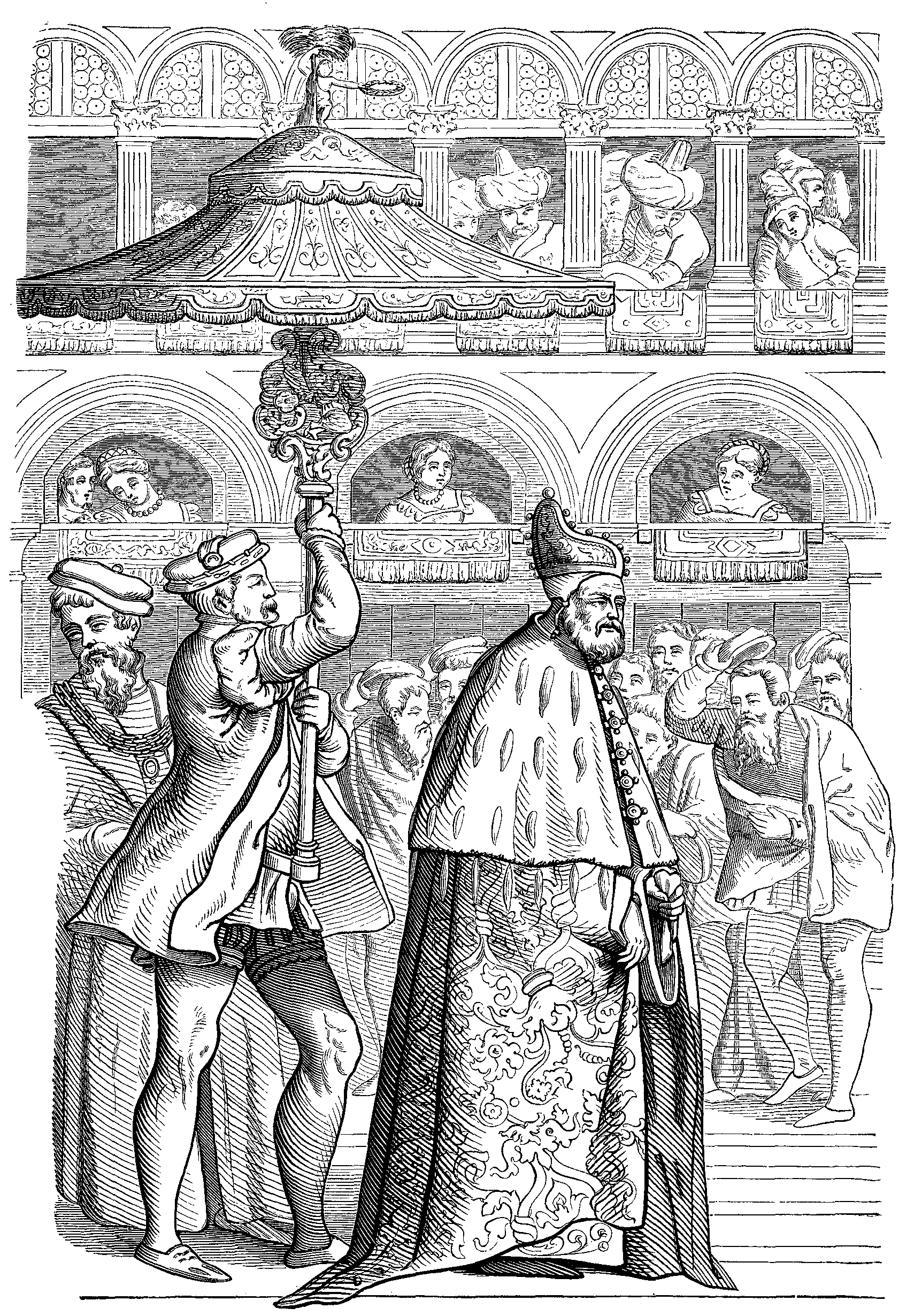

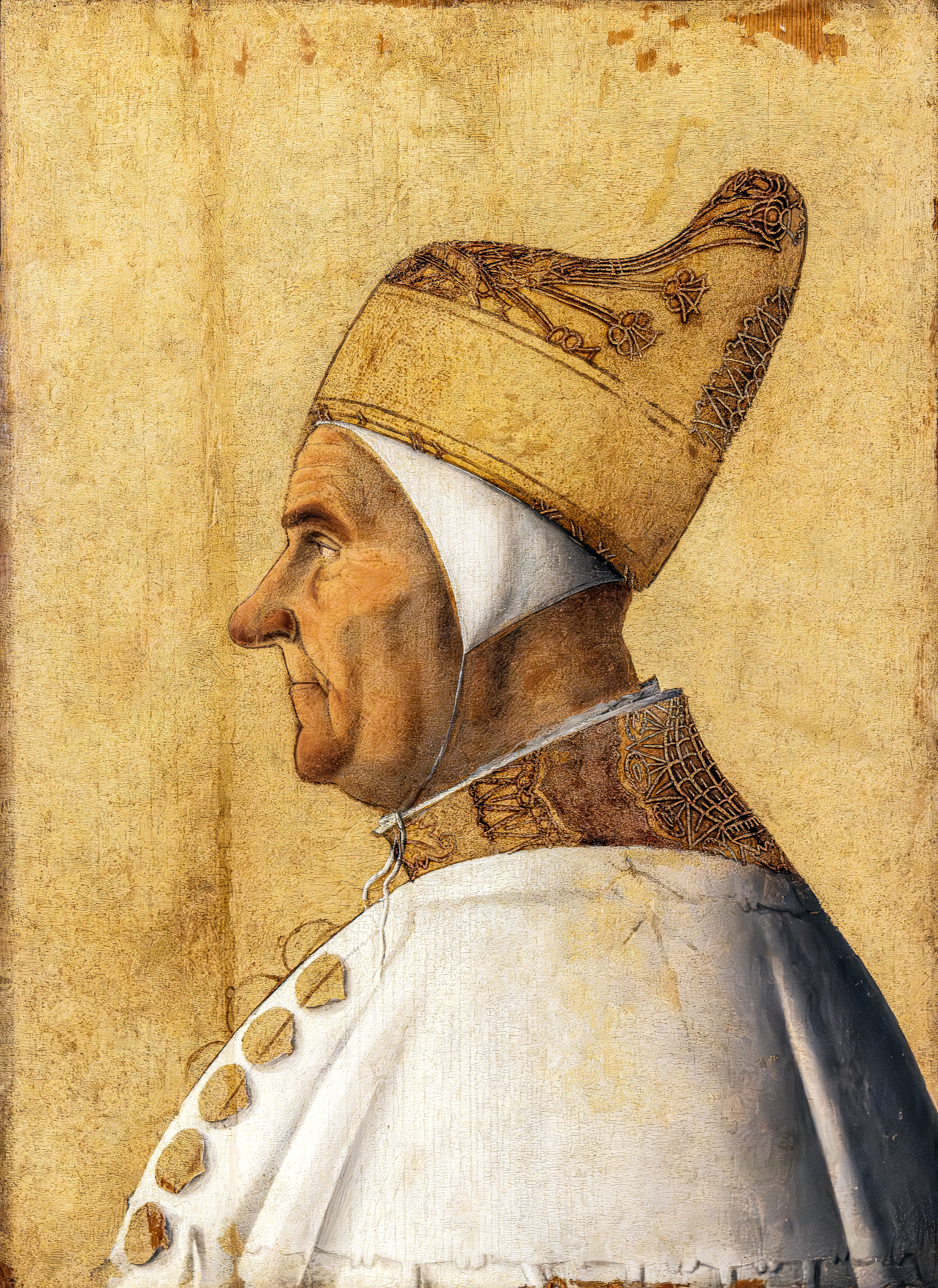

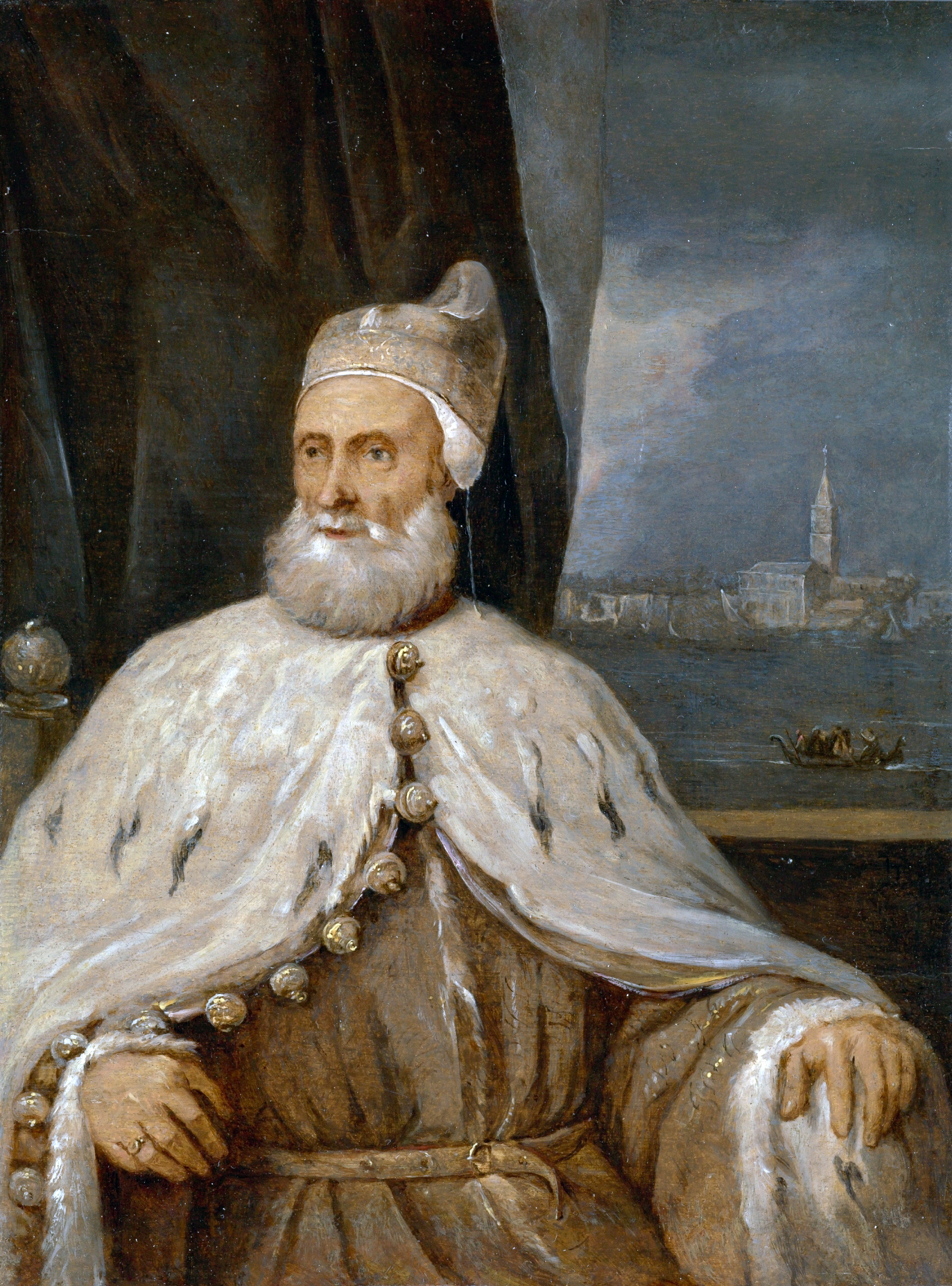

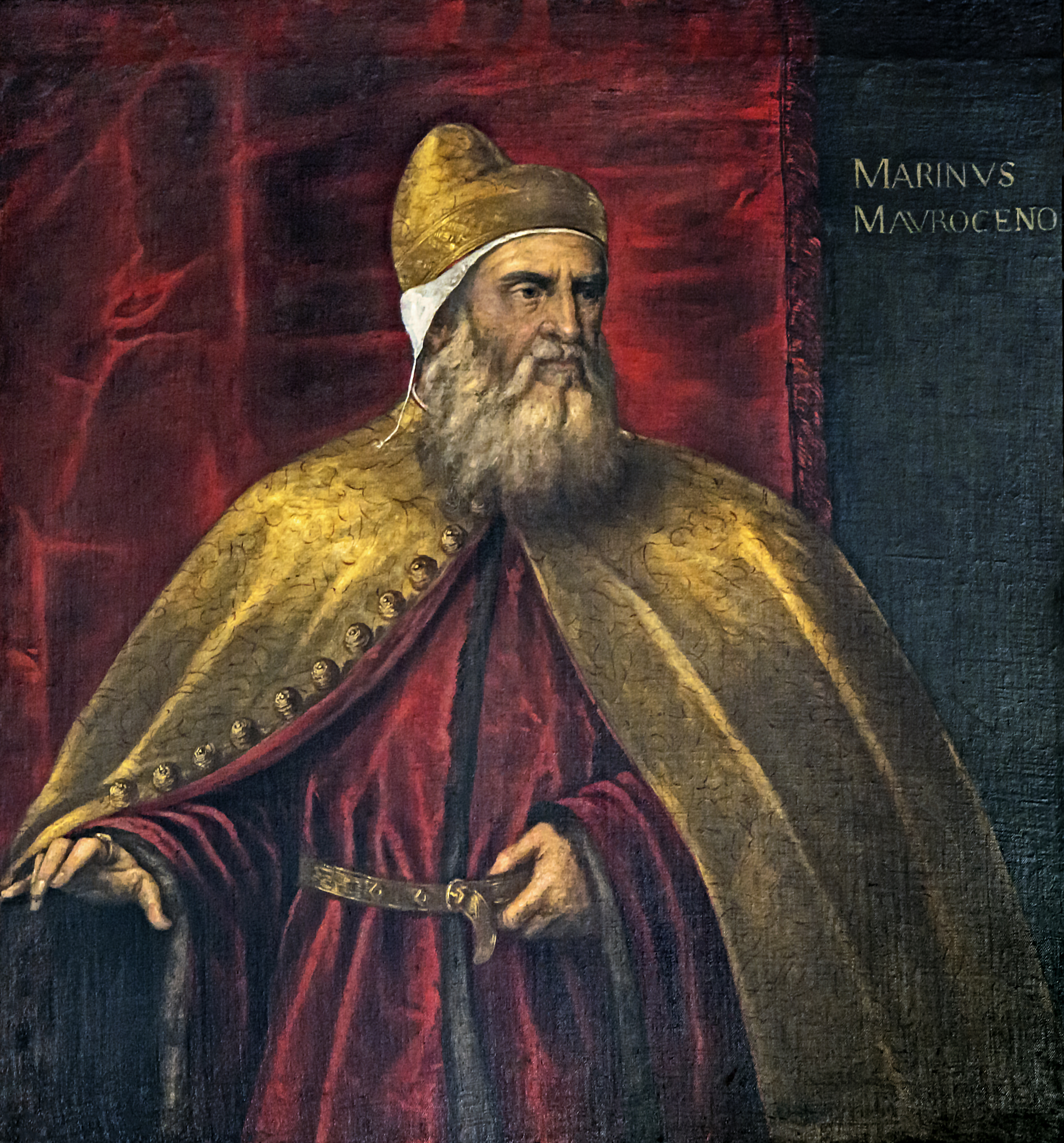

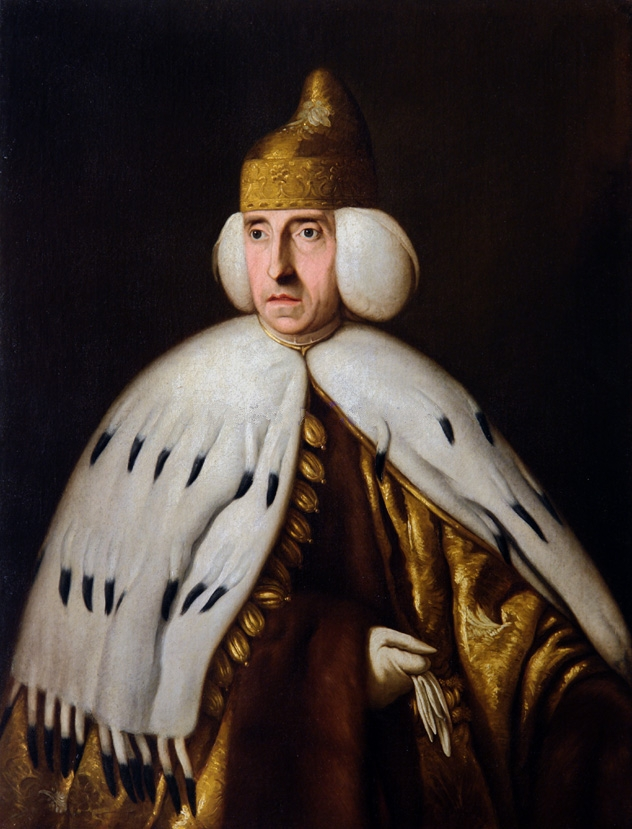

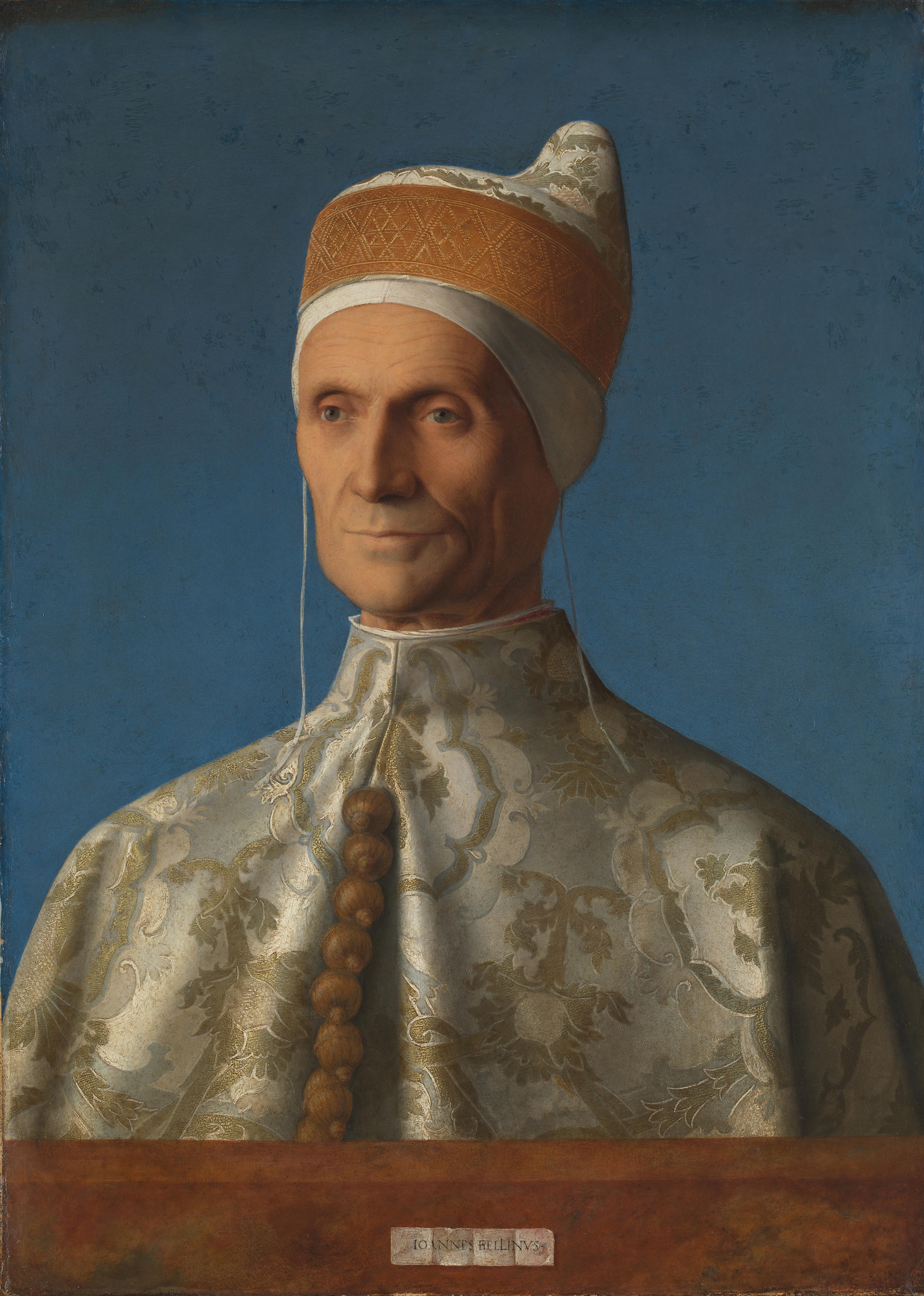

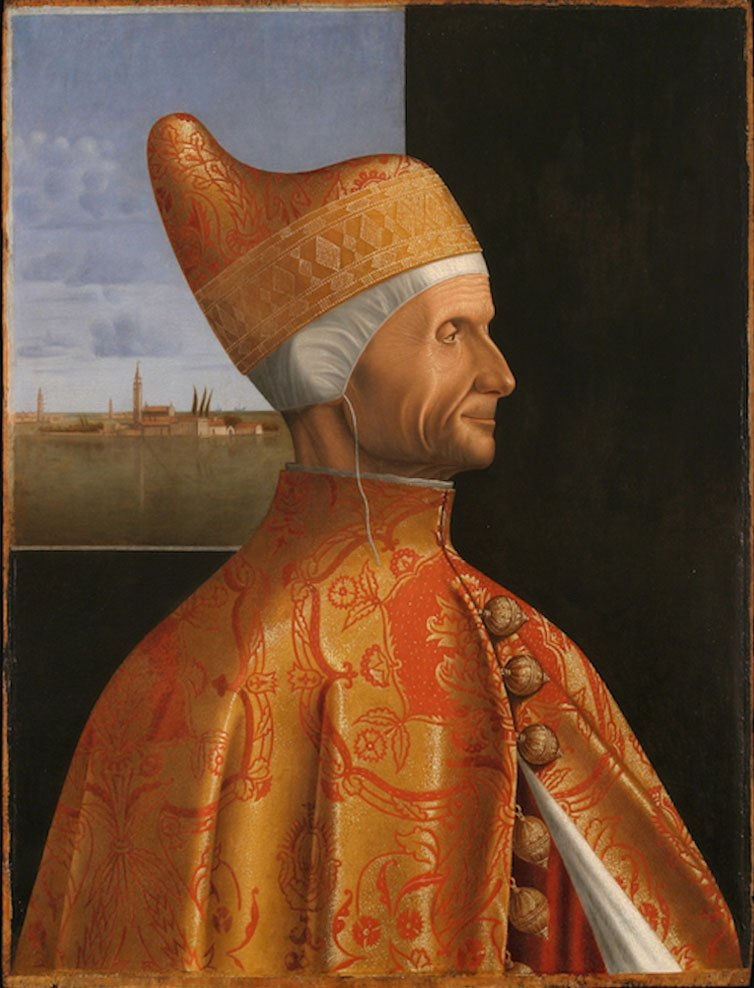

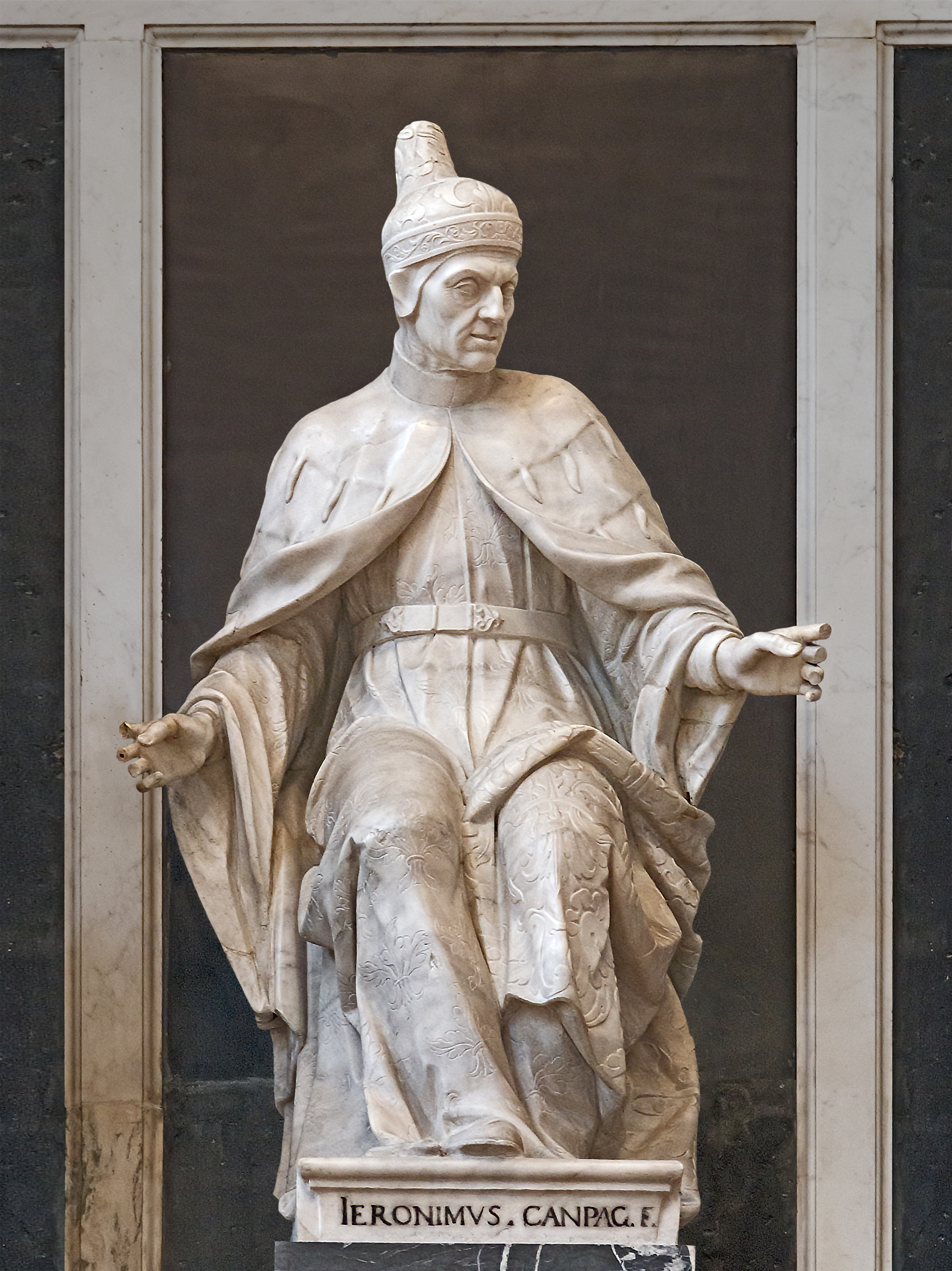

== See also ==
- Doge of Venice
- Republic of Venice
- Commune of Venice
- Signoria of Venice
- Great Council of Venice
