= Thomas Somerville =

Thomas Somerville may refer to:

- Thomas Somerville, 1st Lord Somerville (died 1434), Lord of the Parliament of Scotland
- Thomas Somerville (minister) (1740–1830), Scottish minister, antiquarian and amateur scientist
- Sir Thomas de Somerville (c. 1245–1300), Scottish noble

== See also ==
- Thomas Somerville Stewart (1806–1889) was a Philadelphia architect, engineer, and real estate developer
