= Serrata del Maggior Consiglio =

Constitutional process in medieval Venice

The Great Council Lockout (Italian: Serrata del Maggior Consiglio) was a constitutional process, started with a 1297 ordinance, by means of which membership of the Great Council of Venice became hereditary. Since it was the Great Council that had the right to elect the Doge, the 1297 ordinance marked a significant change in the constitution of the Republic. This resulted in the exclusion of minor aristocrats and plebeians from participating in the government of the Republic. Although formerly provisional, the ordinance later became a permanent act, and since that time it was disregarded only at times of political or financial crisis (e.g. after the war against the League of Cambrai).

== History ==
=== Historical background ===
When the Commonwealth of Venice was formed, the Doge was assisted by a Council of Wise Men (Consilium Sapientium) elected by the people's assembly (Concio). Once it obtained sovereign power in 1172, the Council came to be known as Great Council. It originally functioned as an extension of the people's assembly, and its members were elected on a yearly basis, with the general election usually falling on the day of Saint Michael (29 September). Later, in 1207 the election system was changed; the Concio was required to elect three representatives (up to seven since 1230), who had the duty to nominate the Councillors.

Over the years, the Great Council became the bone of contention between the people's party, which aimed to preserve the status quo, and the aristocratic party, which aimed to exclude up-starts from the government. On 5 October 1286, during the government of Doge Giovanni Dandolo, the aristocratic party presented a bill to reform the eligibility criteria for the Great Council, with the purpose of limiting its members to those who had already joined the Council or those whose paternal relatives held the position of Councilman. The proposal also required that candidates without family credentials could run for a position only upon joint approval on behalf of the Doge, the Minor Council, and the Council of Forty (Quarantia). After this bill was rejected, another bill was proposed, which required new entrants to be subject to approval on behalf of outgoing Councilmen. However, even this proposal was rejected.

=== The First "Lockout" (Serrata) ===
On 25 November 1289, Pietro Gradenigo, who was the leader of the aristocratic party, was elected Doge of the Republic. After 6 years he submitted a new lockout provision drawing on drafts of the previous ones. On 6 March 1296 the proposal was rejected by a narrow majority. Finally, after new yearly elections (29 September 1296), the Council approved the bill on 28 February 1297 (that is, the last month of 1296, according to the Venetian Calendar). The approved provision ruled that, in order to be eligible to be part of the Council, members were required to either have been Councilors at least once in the past four years, or to be patrilinealy related to a former Councilor. In order to better time the entrance of new members, 40 young men would be selected each year by means of a lottery, and their names inscribed in the list of candidates.

==== Content of the Provision ====
The 1297 Provision empowered the Council of the Forty, granting it the following rights and duties with regards to the election of the Great Council:

- The Forty had the duty to compile a list of previous Councilors who held a position in the past 4 years. Whoever appeared in such list met the eligibility criteria;
- The Forty had also the duty to elect the Great Council on a yearly basis.
- In order to be elected, candidates needed a minimum of 12 votes in a session with 30 attendants (75% of the Council of Forty), provided the voting session was notified to them with at least a 3 days notice;
- Once elected, Councilors would hold the position until the next day of Saint Michael (29 September 1297);
- Councilors could be confirmed for the next year, as part of the normal election process;
- All those who had to renounce their seat in the Council (e.g. because they were abroad or unable to stay in charge due to other commitments) could be admitted again, but only upon approval of the Council of Forty.

The Provision also made explicit the conditions for its annulment:

- Abrogation was subject to the approval of at least: 5 members of the Minor Council, 25 members of the Council of Forty, and two thirds of the Great Council;
- The Provision had to be verified and ratified with a Council vote taking place twenty-five days before the next Saint Michael's day (4 September 1298);
- If the Provision was not ratified, Councilors were expected to pay a penalty to the State's Attorneys.

=== Following events ===
The Act was ratified in September 1298, and again in 1299. Its approval caused unrest among the people's party, which eventually led to Marin Bocconio's 1300 attempted coup. The failure of his conspiracy triggered the approval of a new provision (22 March 1300), which raised the threshold for the admission of upstart candidates by the Council of Forty (requiring 20 votes instead of the former 12 needed for election).

A second wave of limitations occurred in 1307. This led to another attempted coup (1310), on behalf of a faction led by Bajamonte Tiepolo. The conspiracy was averted by the Doge Pietro Gradenigo. As a reaction to the conspiracy, the government instituted a new special court—that is, the Council of Ten, whose purpose was that of dealing with crimes against the constitution of the State.

In 1315, the process of compiling lists of candidates was formalized thanks to the creation of the Golden Book (Libro d'Oro): namely, a demographic registry that included the names of all the eligible candidates aged 18 or above. The creation of the Golden Book was followed by the enactment of even stricter rules against up-starters (homini novi).

The final lockout occurred in 1319. The election of new candidates was ultimately abolished and the status of Councillor became automatic for all male patricians aged 25 or above. An exception was made every year for 30 young patricians, randomly chosen on the day of Saint Barbara, who were allowed to join at the age of 20. Since then, the Great Council positions remained hereditary. Eventually, this led to the dismissal of the obsolete people's assembly (Concio) in 1423.

=== Effects ===
According to Diego Puga and Daniel Trefler, the Serrata del Maggior Consiglio (which made parliamentary participation hereditary) led to barriers to participation in the most profitable aspects of long-distance trade. This diminished the ability of members outside the hereditary aristocracy from participating in political decisions and in economic processes such as the colleganza. This stratification in political and economic power led to a fundamental shift from political openness, economic competitiveness, and social mobility and led to political closure, extreme economic inequality, and social stratification and stiffness.

== See also ==
- Venetian nobility
- Pietro Gradenigo
- Marin Bocconio
