= Electoral capitulation =

Medieval contract

An electoral capitulation (German: Wahlkapitulation) was initially a written agreement in parts of Europe, principally the Holy Roman Empire, whereby from the 13th century onward, a candidate to a prince-bishopric had to agree to a set of preconditions presented by the cathedral chapter prior to electing a bishop to a vacant see.

Starting with the election of Emperor Charles V in 1519, a similar electoral capitulation was presented by the prince-electors to the future emperor. In both episcopal and imperial capitulations, the candidate swore to respect the terms and conditions set in the capitulation in the event of his election. The capitulation usually reaffirmed the privileges of the electors and placed limitations on the future prince-bishop or emperor's authority to exercise power.

== Holy Roman Empire ==
=== Episcopal elections ===
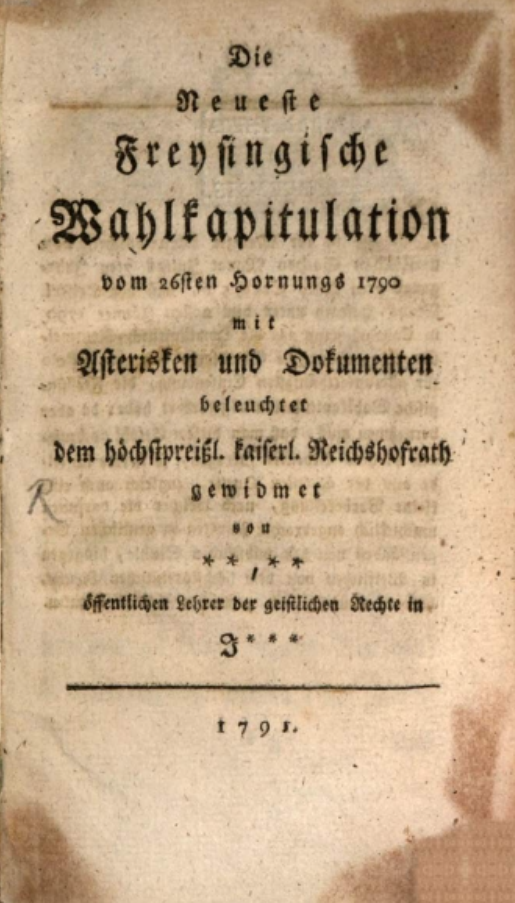
Title page of the electoral capitulation agreed to by the new prince-bishop of Freising in 1790

The use of electoral capitulations in the elections of prince-bishops started during the first half of the 13th century and spread to all the prince-bishoprics of the Holy Roman Empire. Capitulations in advance of episcopal elections were banned by Pope Innocent XII in 1695 and by the emperor in 1698 but the ban was ignored by the cathedral chapters, and episcopal capitulations were sworn by would-be bishops until the end of the Empire in the early 19th century.

=== Imperial elections ===
From the 13th century onwards, the electoral body for the election of the King of the Romans in the Holy Roman Empire was the group of powerful princes known as the prince electors. And from the election of Emperor Charles V in 1519, a Wahlkapitulation (capitulatio caesarea) was presented by the prince electors to the future Roman-German emperor.

During negotiations with France within the framework of the Peace of Westphalia, the Wahlkapitulation of Ferdinand III, which provided for imperial rights (Reichsrecht) and imperial estates (Reichsgüter) to be divested, was repealed, and France was given full sovereignty over territories in Alsace and Lorraine.

The permanent electoral capitulation or ständige Wahlkapitulation (capitulatio perpetua) of 1711 was an attempt to lay down the regulations for future kings in a Wahlkapitulation specified in advance. It included provisions that forbade the Empire from being turned into a hereditary monarchy. In this way the prince electors attempted to protect their political position. However, these documents were never ratified by an emperor and so never elevated to an imperial statute (Reichsgesetz).

== Scandinavia ==
In Norway, the electoral capitulation was used in the period from 1449 (Christian I and Charles Knutsson) to 1648, the electoral capitulations of 1449 and 1524 (Frederick I) only being applied to Norway, whilst the rest were applied to Denmark, but because the king reigned in personal union, they also applied automatically to Norway. The capitulation of 1648 was succeeded by absolutism in 1660. The capitulation was a prerequisite for the coronation. In the period between the capitulation and the coronation, the king bore the title "elected king" (erwählter König or utvalgt konge). Despite great variations in the individual documents, they all have one thing in common: they stress the principles of Reichsratskonstitutionalismus ("Imperial Council Constitutionalism"), which contained the rights of the Imperial Council (Reichsrat) to participate in important governmental decisions. Even the awarding of governmental offices to native-born nobility was given increasing weight - in Denmark over the German nobility, in Norway over the German and Danish nobility.

== Poland ==
Between 1573 and 1764, the pacta conventa (Latin for "articles of agreement") was a contractual agreement entered into between the "Polish nation" (i.e., the Szlachta, nobility) and a newly elected king upon his election to the throne. The capitulation signed by King Henry of Poland in 1573, the so-called Henrician Articles, was signed by all subsequent Polish monarchs in addition to their own individual pacta.

== Papal elections ==
For a long period, from the 15th to 17th centuries, it was common at the election of a new pope for the college of cardinals to demand a capitulation. As early as 1352 an electoral capitulation was compiled for the election of Pope Innocent VI, although he declared it invalid. The Council of Constance (1414–1417) took the view that the rival popes, Gregory XII and Benedict XIII were guilty of perjury because they had broken the terms of their electoral capitulations. In 1431, Pope Eugene IV confirmed his capitulation in a formal papal bull. Pope Paul II reported to Cardinal Jacopo Piccolomini-Ammannati that, immediately after the election, he pledged to comply with his capitulation, but later the cardinals were required to consent to a substantial revision. Today, electoral agreements are forbidden before the election of the pope, as per the constitution, Universi Dominici Gregis.

== Venice ==
There were also electoral capitulations for the election of the Venetian doges, the promissione ducale, the oldest of which has survived from 1192. The promissione ducale was drafted before the election of a new doge by a specially formed commission, the Correttori alle promissione ducale, the Doge had to read it at his election, to praise it and was only crowned afterwards. From 1595 onwards his promissione ducale was read to him every two months. In the course of the centuries this "contract" became more and more extensive and from 1595 it was printed. The promissione ducale of Doge Marino Grimani contained 108 pages, Doge Giovanni II Cornaro's had 165 pages, and the one for the last doge, Ludovico Manin, had 301 pages.

== Bibliography ==
- Duchhardt, Heinz (ed.) (2015). Wahlkapitulationen in Europa [Electoral Capitulations in Europe]. Göttingen: Vandenhoeck & Ruprecht, ISBN 978-3-525-36086-6.
