= Barnabotti =

Class of impoverished nobility found in the Venetian Republic

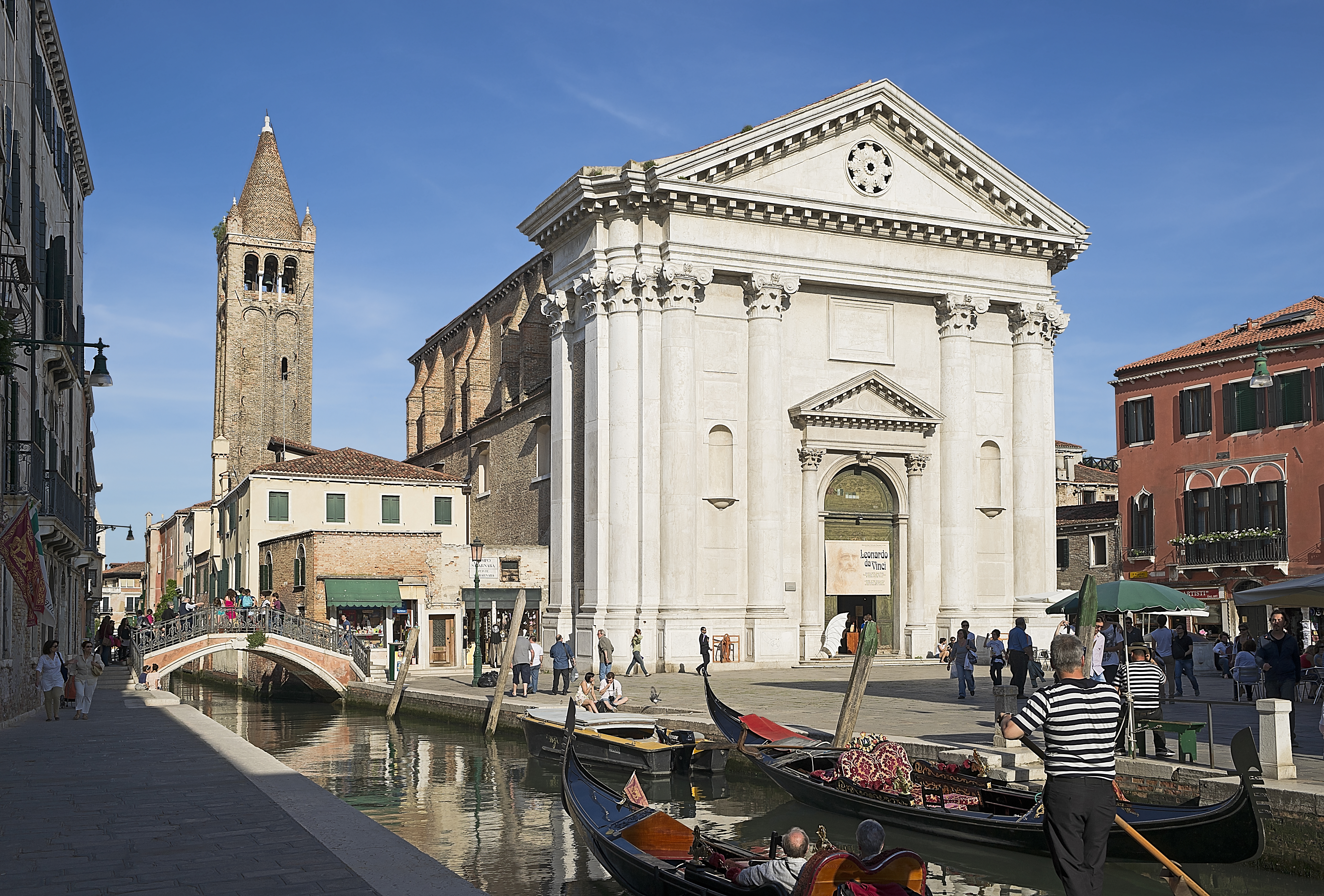
Church and Campo San Barnaba

The Barnabotti were a class of impoverished nobility found in the Venetian Republic towards the end of the Republican period. The term Barnabotti derives from the fact that the group met and lived in the zone of the Campo San Barnaba. The presence of these nobles in this area is attested by toponyms such Casìn dei Nobili, used to describe certain gambling houses. The area of Campo San Barnaba, being distant from the city centre, attracted lower rents.

The term Barnabotti refers to those patricians who, although having lost much of their fortune, continued by law to maintain their seat in the Great Council of Venice, the assembly that governed the Venetian city and state. Although they maintained a position of political influence, due to their impoverishment the Barnabotti as a group were frequently involved in disputes with the rest of the nobility. Their lack of means, however, meant that they were susceptible to vote buying. Barnabotti were barred from commercial trades, and were therefore given a small allowance from the state.

During the 17th century, efforts were made to improve the welfare of the Barnabotti, by establishing a school in 1617 for the special education of children, the Accademia dei Nobili alla Giudecca. However, the number of poor nobles increased with the loss of the island of Crete and the migration of its nobles to the city of Venice.

After the plague of 1630-1631, the number of nobles began to fall dramatically. An insider commented late in the 17th century that there were only fourteen or fifteen men capable of serving as Savio Grande. The need for recruiting noblemen was used to justify granting membership in the Great Council to rich patrons. Between 1645 and 1718, nobility was conferred on 127 persons, each of whom paid 100,000 ducats and were personally recommended by the Collegio. This, however, failed to reduce falling numbers. Membership fell from around 2,500 members in the mid-16th century, to 1,660 after the plague, and in 1775 membership was down to 1,300 members. Among adult Venetian males in 1520, about 6.4 percent were noblemen. By 1797, this number was down to 3.2 percent.
