= Minor Council =

The governmental structure of the Venetian Republic

The Minor Council (Italian: Minor Consiglio) or Ducal Council was one of the main constitutional bodies of the Republic of Venice, and served both as advisors and partners to the Doge of Venice, sharing and limiting his authority.

== Establishment ==
The Minor Council was established likely sometime between 1172 and 1178, shortly after the Great Council. Both councils had their antecedents in a 'council of wise men' (consilium sapientes) that the Venetian patriciate had placed next to the Doge to advise him and curtail his independent authority, and is attested at least since 1143. Indeed, the first known ducal councillors (consiglieri ducali) were elected along with Doge Pietro Barbolano in 1032, to prevent a recurrence of the monarchical tendencies of his predecessors.

== Composition ==
The members of the Minor Council were elected by the Great Council, and the chosen members were prohibited from refusing the election on heavy penalties. The number of ducal councillors was raised to six, one for each district of the city. Their terms of office lasted for one year, followed by another year (later raised to 16 months) where they were prohibited from occupying the same office. The ducal councillors were ex officio members of the Great Council.

Very soon after its establishment, the heads of the Council of Forty (Capi dei Quaranta) became associated with the Minor Council, sometimes substituting for missing ducal councillors and holding the right to vote with them in certain matters. This association is documented as established fact by 1231.

In 1437, three of the year's outgoing councillors were named as 'inferior' councillors, not formally part of the Minor Council, but tasked with representing it in the Criminal Forty.

== Role and powers ==
The main function of the Minor Council was to share in and limit the Doge's power. Indeed, so close was the association of the two, that they are frequently almost conflated in the sources. The Doge was dependent on the assent of at least four ducal councillors for his decisions to have force, and could not open dispatches except in their presence, while conversely the Minor Council did not require the Doge's presence to act.

In the absence of a Doge, or during an interregnum, the Minor Council handled all government, and one of the ducal councillors—not always the eldest—became the Vice Doge. The Minor Council also initiated the election of a new Doge, and was empowered to introduce any changes to the process that they sought fit. The Vice Doge was then responsible for crowning the newly elected Doge with the chief symbol of his office, the corno ducale.

Together with the Capi dei Quaranta and the Doge, the Minor Council formed the Signoria of Venice, the formal Venetian government, and along with the boards of the savi formed the de facto cabinet, the Full College.

The Minor Council co-presided with the Doge over all governing councils of the Republic, and had the right to initiate laws and proposals to be put before the Great Council. The Minor Council was also notified in advance of any draft proposal initiated by other councils, and had the right to delay its presentation to the Great Council for three days. Furthermore, even individual ducal councillors had the right to convene the Great Council. Once the lower councils had reached a decision, however, the Minor Council was bound to obey it. Indeed, the oath of office of the ducal councillors explicitly obliged them to enforce this on the Doge, and to oppose him should he try to override or ignore a decision of the lower councils.

As part of the Signoria, the Minor Council shared in the supervision of the courts, and adjudicated jurisdiction in disputes between junior magistracies. The Doge's oath of office obliged him and his ducal councillors to visit the courts in person and hear any complaints brought to them there. Until 1446, the Minor Council also had the responsibility of interpreting the law.

In addition, the ducal councillors were responsible for supervising the administration of Venice itself, and the elections of its officials. In financial matters, the Minor Council originally had the right to dispose of public funds of up to 10 pounds of gold, but this was abolished in 1441.

== Sources ==
- Brown, Horatio F. (1887). Venetian Studies. London: Kegan Paul, Trench & Co. OCLC 458907462.
- Da Mosto, Andrea (1937). L'Archivio di Stato di Venezia. Indice Generale, Storico, Descrittivo ed Analitico. Tomo I: Archivi dell' Amministrazione Centrale della Repubblica Veneta e Archivi Notarili (in Italian). Rome: Biblioteca d'arte editrice. OCLC 772861816.
- Lane, Frederic Chapin (1973). Venice, A Maritime Republic. Baltimore, Maryland: Johns Hopkins University Press. ISBN 0-8018-1445-6.
