= Signoria of Venice =

Republic of Venice government body from 1423

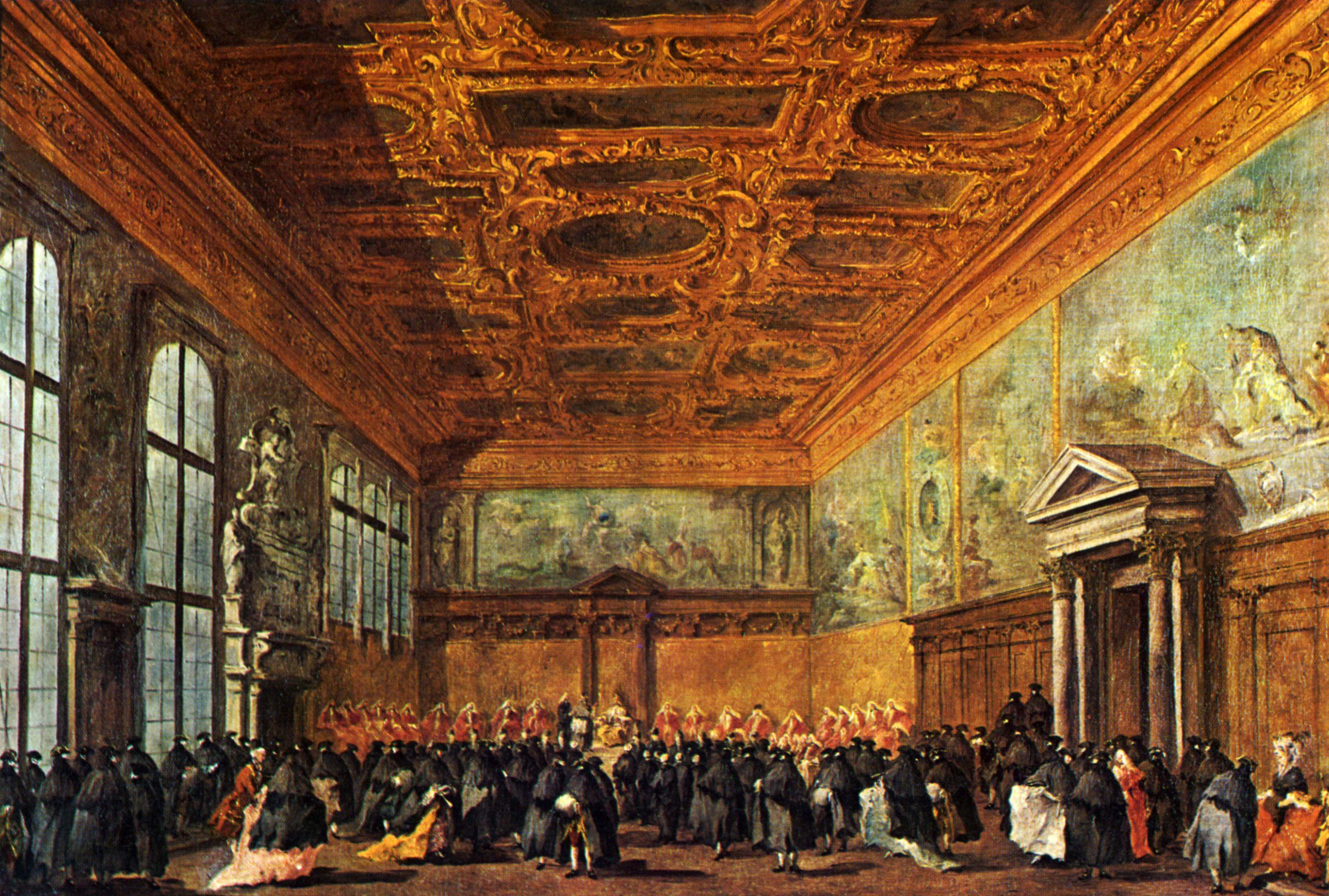
Francesco Guardi, "The audience allowed by the Doge of Venice in the hall of the Collegio in Palazzo Ducale", painting on canvas, Musée du Louvre, Paris

The Signoria of Venice (Serenissima Signoria) was the supreme body of government of the Republic of Venice. The older Commune of Venice was replaced by the Signoria from 1423 on, being later officially adopted in the Promissione Ducale by Cristoforo Moro (12 May 1462). It constituted a center of power which included the doge's power.

The Signoria can be thought of as the combination of the Doge and the other persons commissioned to collaborate and to rule with him. With the passage of time these functionaries became copartners.

The governmental structure of the Venetian Republic

== The members of the Signoria of Venice ==
The Signoria of Venice consisted of:

- the Doge, head of the Republic
- the Minor Council (Minor Consiglio), created in 1175, which was composed of the Doge's 6 advisors.
- the 3 leaders of the Quarantia, the supreme tribunal, created in 1179.

The Doge (from Latin dux "leader") was the chief magistrate in the republics of Venice (until 1797) and Genoa (until 1805).

The Signoria was considered a very important body of government, more important than the Doge himself. The sentence se l'è morto el Doge, non-l'è morta la Signoria (The Doge is dead, but not the Signoria) was ritually said during the ceremonies set for the death of the Doge.

== See also ==
- Republic of Venice
- The Quarantia
- Major Council
- Minor Council
- Venetian nobility

== Bibliography ==
- Edward Wallace Muir Jr. (1986). Civic Ritual in Renaissance Venice. Princeton University Press. p. 275. ISBN 0-691-10200-7.
