= Concio =

General assembly of freemen in the Republic of Venice

The Concio (from the Latin contio, "assembly"), in the Republic of Venice, was the general assembly of freemen (citizens and patricians) from which the Doge was elected. It existed between the years 742 and 1423, although it was mostly ceremonial after the Serrata del Maggior Consiglio passed power into the hands of the aristocratic class.

== History ==
=== The origin and the conquest of power for the election of the Doge ===
The origin of the popular assembly is uncertain. Assemblies of free men were already in existence in the 6th–7th centuries in various cities of maritime Venice for the election of local magistrates (or tribunes). Although the Venetian traditions called for a general meeting of Venetians, in 697 the appointment of the first Doge, Paolo Lucio Anafesto, would have been the prerogative of the Byzantine Emperor through the Exarchate of Ravenna.

The first actual election was probably that of the third Doge, Orso Ipato, when in 726 the Venetians, rejecting measures imposed by iconoclasts of the 'Byzantine emperor Leo III the Isaurian, chose their own leadership autonomously. Upon the death of Orso however, the Byzantines replaced the government with a ducal courts annually in the magistri militum until 742 when the emperor formally granted the populate the right to elect the Doge.

The power of the assembly at this time had yet be precisely defined and author John Deacon reports that in 887 Doge Giovanni Participazio II had to reaffirm that it was the responsibility of the people's assembly to elect the Doge.

=== The struggle for power ===
Despite the power delegated to the Concio, over time several dukes tried to change the assembly, turning the monarchy from being an elective into a hereditary arrangement. One strategy chosen was to circumvent the electoral power of the Concio by associating the throne with a co-regent, also called co-Dux, selected from children or close relatives. This person would, on the death of the Doge, automatically succeed him, with the co-regent being already on the throne and thus in a position of strength.

It is unclear what role that the Assembly had at the time in the coronation of coreggenti, and whether it could exert some form of confirmation of their appointment. However between the 8th and 11th centuries, there were at least fifteen coreggenti that were associated with the throne.

This chaotic phase was resolved in 1032 when the Concio refused to recognize the coronation of Domenico Orseolo and appointed Flabanico Domenico in his place. At this time the Concio enacted the first law of the Constitutional Republic. This law forbade the practice of association to the throne, separated the perpetual Orseoli from the government, and provided two ducal councilors for the Doge, to constantly supervise his actions.

=== The training of municipal institutions and the loss of power of Concio ===
After this period the Concio in effect was the supreme arbiter of the state. It now faced the need to create permanent organizations that were able to replace the previous ducal power structures. At the same time, the ancient noble families were no longer committed to push for a hereditary sovereign and began to form, along with other prominent families, a class of aristocrats able to influence and direct the city politics.

In 1143, the city installed its first Consilium Sapientium, who was appointed by and responsible to support the Doge permanently in government. The new communal form of the State was sanctioned by the Veneciarum Commune ("City of Venice") documents.

The first step that marked the beginning of the decline of the power of Concio occurred in 1172. At this time, the Consilium Sapientium, became the Great Council and was entrusted with the ordinary legislative power. Also at this time, it decided to entrust the election ducal seven elected by voters. A second event came six years later in 1178 when the Concio lost significant control over the appointment of the doge. From that, the seven electors from this nominated no longer directly choose the Doge: they instead began to raffle four with the task of appointing the forty ducal actual voters. The Council of Forty sold out the task and then remained in power as an assembly of the government and as a supreme court.

In 1207 the appointment of members of the Great Council was entrusted to a small group of three voters and then subsequently increased to seven in 1230. A consequence of this choices was that the aristocratic part increased in these municipal bodies. The status quo of popular power supported by an aristocratic power cracked in 1286 when two attempts, rejected, to foreclose access to the Great Council families popular, marked the opening of hostilities between the two factions. Rejected again in 1296, with difficulty, the proposed Serrata was finally approved at the urging of the Doge Pietro Gradenigo on 28 February 1297.

After these events, in 1300 and in 1310 a plot of Marin Bocconio and Tiepolo attempted a restoration of the people. However, these failed and the aristocratic form of the state was now a reality.

=== The abolition ===
Deprived of any real power, the Concio of the People survived only as a formal meeting at dell'acclamazione under the new Doge that was elected. The body still presented the crowd with a ritual phrase:

( VEC )

"Questi xe monsignor el Doxe, se ve piaze!"

( EN )

"He is our lord, the Doge, if you like!" (ritual presentation of the new Doge to the People)

The meeting was at this point useless and officially abolished in 1423. However, the custom of ritual request for approval to the people remained in use until the fall of the Republic in 1797.

== See also ==
- Arengo
- Doge
- Great Council of Venice
- Venetian nobility
