= English invasion of Scotland (1300) =

Military conflict

English invasion of Scotland of 1300
- Part of Wars of Scottish Independence
Date	May 1300
Location	Scotland
Result	Militarily inconclusive; English withdrawal

Belligerents
Kingdom of Scotland	Kingdom of England

Commanders and leaders
Robert de Brus (till May); John Comyn; William de Lamberton; Ingram de Umfraville (from May) (as Guardians of Scotland)	Edward I

Strength
	20,000

The English invasion of Scotland of 1300 was a military campaign undertaken by Edward I of England to continue gains from the 1298 invasion, in retaliation of the Scots recapture of Stirling Castle in 1299 and the revolt in Annandale, Nithsdale and Galloway against English rule.

A Scottish force was defeated at the Battle on the Cree in August 1300. Edward I hampered by food shortages, political infighting and funds was able to reinforce his garrisons and castles in Annandale, Nithsdale and Galloway, but was only able to reach Stirling, before returning to England.

== Background ==
Stirling Castle, Caerlaverock Castle and Bothwell Castle were besieged by Scottish forces in 1299 and the English garrisons were forced to surrender. Robert de Brus, Earl of Carrick attacked Lochmaben Castle in August 1299, that was under the control of the English, in his fathers the Lord of Annandale's lands in Annandale, however failed to capture it. The Scots garrison from the recently recaptured Caerlaverock Castle, raided and attacked the garrison at Lochmaben. The captain of the Scots garrison of Caerlaverock, Robert Cunningham, was killed during one of those raids and his head was placed on the walls of Lochmaben Castle by the Lochmaben's captain Robert Felton. Edward I began preparations for a new invasion in 1299, however due to baron differences and his impending marriage to Margaret of France, the half sister of Philip IV of France, he had to wait until 1300 to launch another invasion of Scotland.

== Invasion ==
Edward I called for his army to assemble at Carlisle. In May 1300, Edward I led an English army consisting of 20,000 along the Western Marches and a campaign into Annandale, Nithsdale and Galloway to follow up on the success of 1298 and to put down resistance to English rule. The army travelled from Carlisle, to Annan, then to relieve the garrison of Lochmaben Castle. The English then placed Caerlaverock Castle under siege in July 1300, which they captured after five days. After the fall of Caerlaverock Castle, the English marched to Dumfries and then to Kirkcudbright. The battle on the Cree, in August 1300, between English forces and Scottish forces led by John Comyn, Lord of Badenoch, John Comyn, Earl of Buchan and Ingram de Umfraville, was a victory for the English forces.

In August, the Pope sent a letter demanding that Edward I withdraw from Scotland. Edward I marched as far as Stirling Castle. Due to the lack of success, Edward arranged a truce with the Scots on 30 October 1300 and returned to England, not being able to capture Stirling Castle.

== Aftermath ==
The Scots had refused to engage in open battle, apart from a number of small skirmishes, preferring instead to raid the English countryside in smaller groups. The lack of funds and supplies, accompanied by demands by his Scottish supporters to grant them estates held by Robert de Brus, led to the campaign stuttering to a halt and the withdrawal of the English army from Scotland. Edward I began planning almost immediately for a larger campaign in 1301.

== Citations and references ==
Citations

References

- Barrow, G.W.S: Robert Bruce. University of California Press. 1965
- Chalmers, George: Caledonia: Or, An Account, Historical and Topographic, of North Britain; from the Most Ancient to the Present Times: with a Dictionary of Places, Chorographical and Philological, Volume 3. T. Cadell and W. Davies, 1824
