= Promissione ducale =

Oath of office of the Doge of Venice

The promissione ducale (lit. 'ducal promise'; Latin: promissio domini ducis) was an oath of office sworn by the incoming Doge of Venice. It contained not only an oath of allegiance to the Republic of Venice, but also spelled out the constitutional limitations to the Doge's power, which he swore to abide by.

== History ==
The promissione had its origins in the oaths of office sworn by civil magistrates in the Italian city-states (communes), covering both the established legal order, and the exercise of jurisdiction by the magistrates. Thus in Venice too, the Doges of Venice were accustomed to take such oaths, or promissioni, which covered both matters political as well as matters of criminal law; the earliest of which is the collection of penal guidelines known as the promissione del maleficio of Orio Mastropiero (r. 1178–1192) in 1181, which was reformed in 1195 under Enrico Dandolo (r. 1192–1205).

The political oath of office on the other hand contained a series of promises to govern and adjudicate fairly and impartially, maintain the secrets of the state, execute the deliberations of the Great Council of Venice, etc. At the same time, already in the very first surviving example, that of Doge Dandolo in 1193, it contained a set of restrictions on the Doge's power, such as a prohibition on conducting direct correspondence with foreign princes, or of meddling in the election of the Patriarch of Venice. These restrictions were increased over time, so that in 1229, after the death of Doge Pietro Ziani, a commission of five 'correctors of the promissione ducale' (Correttori alle promissione ducale) was established to revise them. In the course of the centuries the promissione became more and more extensive, and from 1595 on it was printed. The promissione ducale of Doge Marino Grimani (r. 1595–1605) contained 108 pages, that of Doge Giovanni II Cornaro (r. 1709–1722) had 165 pages, and the one for the last Doge, Ludovico Manin (r. 1789–1797), had 301 pages.

Not only were the powers of the Doge circumscribed, but eventually restrictions were also extended to his relatives, primarily to avoid any danger of the office becoming hereditary: in 1473, the Doge's sons and grandsons were prohibited from being elected to any council apart from the Great Council, and three years later they were forbidden from being elected to the boards of savii as well. These restrictions were only partially lifted a few decades before the end of the Republic: in 1763, the Doge's brother and two of his sons were allowed to sit in the Venetian Senate, but without the right to vote during the Doge's lifetime. The oath equally also contained provisions regarding the Doge's spouse, the Dogaressa, including her clothing and ceremonial duties.

== See also ==
- Electoral capitulation

== Sources ==
- Leicht, Pier Silverio (1935). "Promissione Ducale". Enciclopedia Italiana (in Italian).
