= Marin Bocconio =

In 1300, in protest of the Serrata del Maggior Consiglio, Marin Bocconio conceived a plot to overthrow the current government of Venice. Marin Bocconio was a man of wealth but not of noble blood. The plot resulted in an incident where Bocconio and his followers knocked on the doors of the Great Council to claim their right to a voice in government of the state. The Doge, Pietro Gradenigo, invited the protesters in individually to let them speak their concerns. The protesters accepted the invitation, after which each was seized and individually killed, to a number of ten. Promptly after this event, protest of the new government ceased from news of this event.

Differing accounts suggest that conspirators were arrested before plans were fully matured, and that leaders were individually executed at the columns near the Porta della Carta. However it may have occurred, Bocconio's revolt was crushed, and the Doge took advantage of it to render admission to the ruling political class more difficult. In the future, no new name could be added to the Great Council unless the individual had obtained upwards of 20 votes from the Council of Forty.
