= Thomas de Somerville =

Scottish noble (c. 1245–1300)

Sir Thomas de Somerville of Linton and Carnwarth, (c.1245-1300) was a 13th-14th century Scottish noble. He was Baron of Linton.

Thomas was the son of Sir William de Somerville.

He swore fealty and homage to King Edward I of England on 15 May 1296 at Roxburgh. During 1297 he joined Sir William Wallace in rebellion.

== Family ==
Thomas had the following known issue:

- Walter, who married Giles, daughter of Sir John Herring.
- John, executed at Newcastle upon Tweed on 4 August 1306.
