= Council of Forty =

Supreme court of the Republic of Venice

The Council of Forty (Italian: Consiglio dei Quaranta), also known as the Quarantia, was one of the highest constitutional bodies of the Republic of Venice, with both legal and political functions as the supreme court.

== Origins and evolution ==
By some estimates, the Quarantia was established in 1179 as part of the constitutional reforms that transformed the monarchy into a communal form. In reality, it was likely established in the early 13th century, and in with responsibilities much different to those it assumed in later times.

It was established as an assembly of forty electors who were entitled at that time to nominate the Doge of Venice. These forty were elected in their turn by nine electors who were nominated by the popular assembly, la concio. After completing their primary role as the Doge's nominators, they remained in power alongside the Doge as the Judiciary, participating with the Consiglio dei Pregadi (Senate) in the state government and the legislative functions, which were often delegated to them by the Great Council, in which the forty were members by law.

After the constitutional reform of 1297, which, with the Serrata del Maggior Consiglio (Lockout of the Great Council), changed the state's form into an aristocratic republic, the Quarantia was responsible for the approval and the scrutiny of new appointments to the Grand Council and the Senate but also, according to Maranini, preparation of draft laws concerning criminal justice and fiscal management.

In time, the Quarantia lost its legislative and representative functions to the Council of Senate and around 1380, after the creation of the College of the Sages, its executive functions were largely taken away as well.

The Forty preserved as a result from that time the functions of governing the mint (defining the fineness of the coins, the nature and quality of the stamping), the preparation of financial and revenue plans to be submitted to the Great Council and, above all, the supreme judicial function. Forty judges were elected by the Great Council and held office for one year; they could be re-elected, and in case of a vacancy could co-opt new judges.

The Supreme Court was tripled over time to better meet the judicial needs, creating new Quarantie:

1. In 1441 the original Forty took the name of Criminal Quarantia and a Civil Quarantia was put alongside it.
2. In 1491 the Civil Quarantia became known as the Old Civil Quarantia and was joined by the New Civil Quarantia.

=== Criminal jurisdiction ===
The Criminal Quarantia had jurisdiction over misdemeanors and felonies and in general over criminal law. The three leaders of the Forty sat beside the Doge and Minor Council in the Serenissima Signoria, the supreme representative body of the Republic. The confirmation of the Serenissima Signoria was necessary to give effect to the death penalty. The functions of prosecutor before this court were assumed by the Avogadori de Comùn.

=== Civil law ===
The Old Civil Quarantia had jurisdiction over issues relating to civil law limited to appeals from Venice, from the Dogado and the Stato da Mar. Access to their judgment was subject to prior scrutiny by the Auditori vecchi alle Sentenze, who in this case held the role of public prosecutor.

The New Civil Quarantia had jurisdiction over issues relating to civil law limited to appeals from the Domini di Terraferma. Access to their judgment was subject to prior scrutiny by the Auditori nuovi alle Sentenze and, in matters involving minors, by the Auditori nuovissimi, who in this case held the role of public prosecutor.
