= Great Council of Venice =

Chief political assembly of the Venetian republic

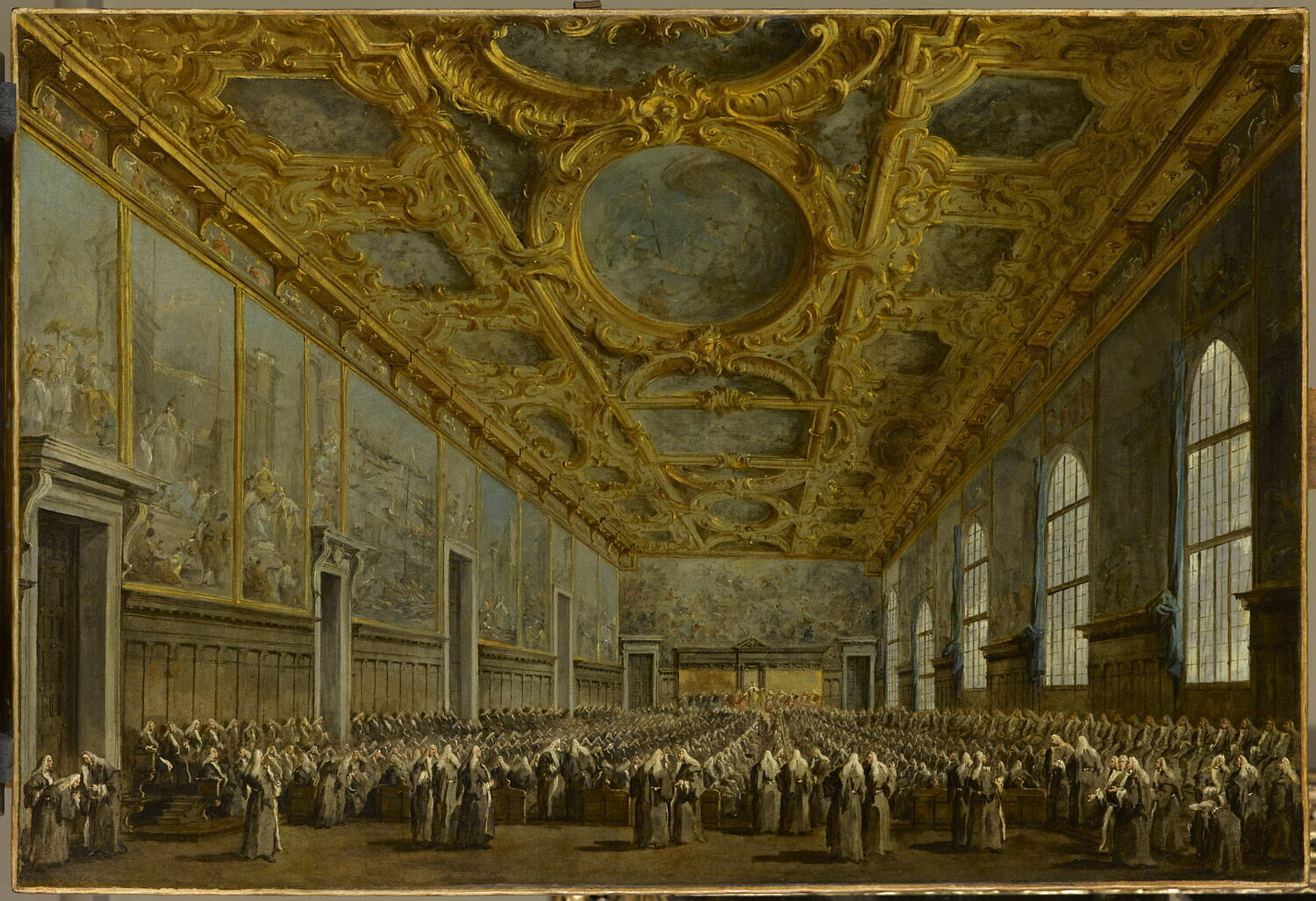
The Doge of Venice addressing the Great Council

The governmental structure of the Venetian Republic

The Great Council or Major Council (Italian: Maggior Consiglio; Venetian: Mazor Consegio) was a political organ of the Republic of Venice between 1172 and 1797. It was the chief political assembly, responsible for electing many of the other political offices and the senior councils that ran the Republic, passing laws, and exercising judicial oversight. Following the lockout (Serrata) of 1297, its membership was established on hereditary right, exclusive to the patrician families enrolled in the Golden Book of the Venetian nobility.

The Great Council was unique at the time in its usage of lottery to select nominators for proposal of candidates, who were thereafter voted upon.

== History ==
The exact origins of the Great Council are unclear. Tradition places its establishment in 1172, but it likely has its origin in a 'Council of Wise Men' (Consilium Sapientium) that is attested in 1141. That was a council established to limit and control the power of the Doge of Venice, and dominated by the Venetian nobility.

=== Early history of the Great Council ===
The Great Council superseded the general assembly of the people (the Concio or Arengo), which was convened only to ratify laws and elect a new Doge. Its role was to elect all magistracies, approve laws, as well as exercise judicial functions including the granting of pardons. However, as the Great Council itself was too large and unwieldy, numbering some 300–400 members already in the 13th century, the actual deliberation and decision-making of government took place in smaller councils, more capable of action. In the 13th century, the most important of these was the Council of Forty, which not only served as the supreme judicial body, but also prepared legislation to be submitted to the Great Council. Its three heads (the capi), along with the six ducal councillors, and the Doge, constituted the Signoria of Venice.

In its early days, the Great Council was a relatively open and democratic institution, its membership being in theory open to the entire body of free citizens. Members were nominated by three electors, though it is unclear how these were chosen; they were selected partly by lot and partly by rotation. In 1230, the electoral process was altered for unknown reasons, with seven electors serving between 29 September and 29 March, and three during the other six months. However, it appears that the number of electors fluctuated, and could be as small as four.

These electors chose one hundred members to be nominated for election to the next year's Great Council, but since there was no alternate slate of candidates, the names chosen were also elected. The "somewhat haphazard" election process placed enormous power on the hands of the very few electors, who were constrained only by force of custom to not abuse their position. In addition, certain office-holders, such as the ducal councillors or members of the Council of Forty, were members ex officio, and they outnumbered the elected members by a considerable margin. As the historian Frederic C. Lane puts it, "one can say that the Great Council contained all the most important people who were available in Venice and a sprinkling of others named to it because someone thought they were potentially important".

=== Serrata of the Great Council ===
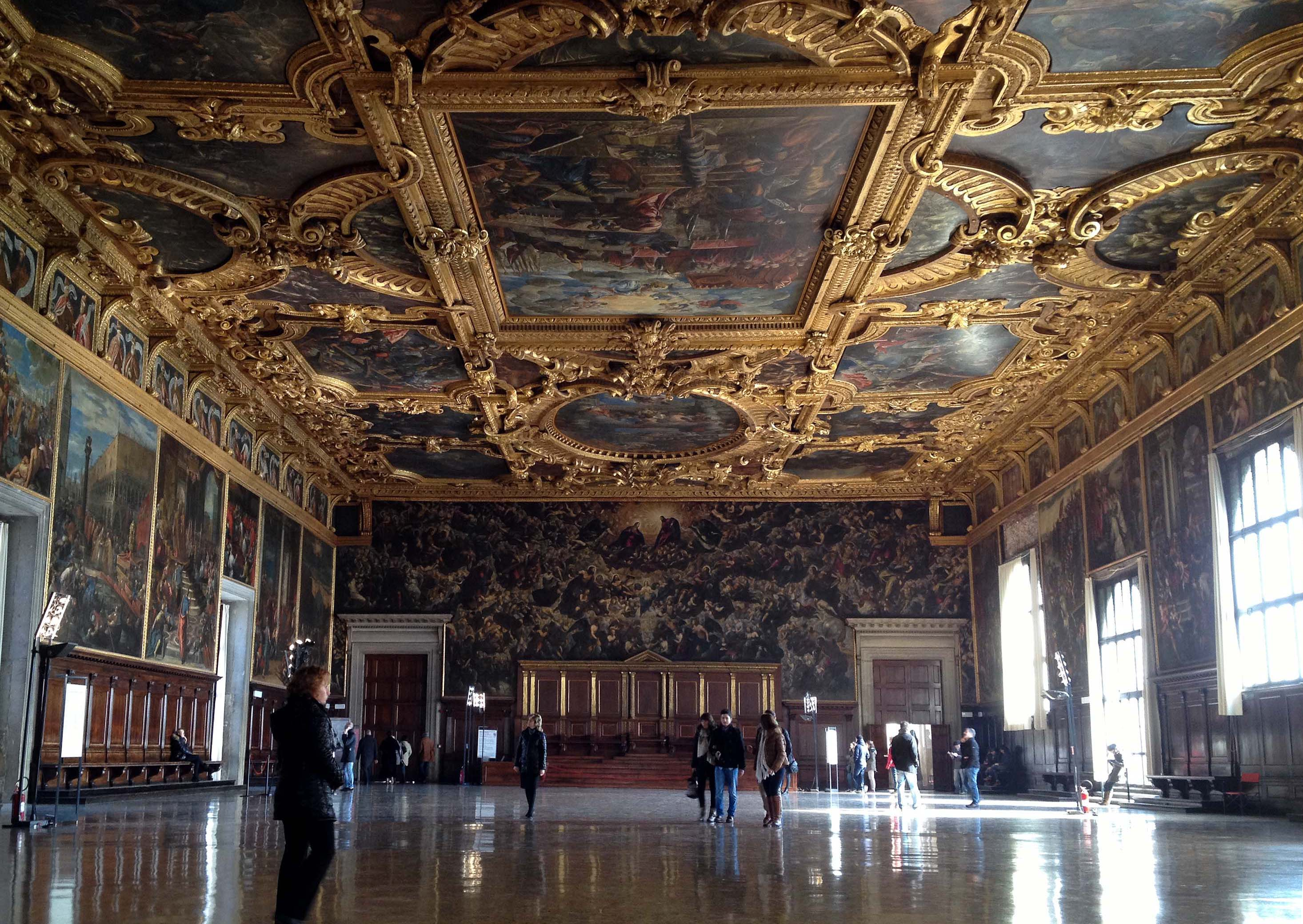
Chamber of the Great Council

As the Great Council elected people to the various offices of the Venetian government, it "had become the gatekeeper for power and prestige in Venice". During the 13th century, this gave rise to a political struggle between reformers, who wanted to open membership to the Great Council, and thus to the political elite, up to newcomers, and conservatives, who wished to preserve the patriciate's dominance.

While the names of noble families predominate during the 13th century, commoners were still included in the rolls. But even among the nobility there were dissensions. A rising population and wealth meant that more and more citizens sought admission to the Great Council, but the traditional patrician families of the Rialto resisted the addition of these nouveau riche to the Council. Likewise complicated was the issue of foreigners, nobles from Venice's nascent colonial empire in the East or from Dalmatia, or Venetian expatriate families returning to the metropolis after decades of absence, due to the fall of the Crusader states in the Levant in the late 13th century. These men were counted as Venetian citizens, but were culturally foreign to the mother city.

There were proposals for reform, notably in October 1286, when the heads of the Council of Forty proposed that only those whose ancestors had been members would automatically have the right to be considered for membership, and that all others would have to be approved by the Doge, the Minor Council, and by the Great Council itself. This proposal failed to pass, as did another, which proposed the election of new members be approved by a majority of the sitting Great Council. Matters came to a head in 1289, when Doge Giovanni Dandolo died, and a mob formed itself into an ad hoc assembly, or arengo, as had been convened in earlier times, demanding the election of admiral Giacomo Tiepolo the son and grandson of Doges, as the new Doge. The Great Council vacillated and suspended its own election process, but Tiepolo refused the nomination, and the Great Council proceeded with the election of Pietro Gradenigo.

This was a critical moment: had the mob prevailed, the trajectory of politics in Venice might have followed that of other Italian city-states, where dynastic rule or populist autocrats backed by mob violence were the norm. Following his election, Gradenigo devoted considerable effort into pushing through a commonly acceptable reform. This was achieved on 28 February 1297, an event known as the Serrata (lit. 'lock-out'). The continued presence of existing members was ensured by stipulating that the present members, or those who had been members during the previous four years, would remain members if they gathered a minimum threshold of 12 votes in the Council of Forty, effectively guaranteeing that all of them would be accepted. In addition, limits on the size of the Great Council were removed, and a law allowed for additional candidates for membership to be submitted by three sitting members, confirmed by the Doge and the Minor Council, and approved by the Council of Forty. Several old-established Venetian commoner families became permanent members of the Council in this way, along with about a dozen families fleeing the fall of Acre in 1291. In this way, the Great Council was more than doubled in size to over 1100 members by 1300, or about 1 percent of the total Venetian population at the time.

This widening of the ruling class appears to have broadly satisfied ambitious men and calmed matters, although at least one commoner who thought that he should have been admitted to the Council, a certain Marin Bocconio, was hanged in 1300 for plotting to kill Gradenigo. It is notable that the reform passed during a nearly disastrous conflict with Venice's main rival, the Republic of Genoa, and that the common people made no serious move to oppose it.

Over the following years, the entry of new members was limited by additional laws that raised the necessary number of votes in the Forty to a majority, 25, and finally 30. In 1319, membership became automatic at the 25th year of age—except for thirty who were chosen by lot on the day of St. Barbara, and were allowed to become members already at 20. In 1323, membership was restricted only to men with ancestors who had held high office, effectively making it hereditary. Regardless of their previous patrician or common origins, the now permanent and hereditary members of the Great Council henceforth constituted the nobility of Venice. This new ruling class numbered almost 200 families and monopolized the higher levels of power in the Republic. Deserving men who distinguished themselves were still admitted in later years, but this was a very rare occasion. To provide for social mobility for ambitious families of wealth and distinction, a new class, the 'citizens' (cittadini) was instituted as a middle class between the closed nobility and the broad mass of the common people (the popolo).

Traditional historiography has lamented the Serrata as "the death of the Venetian republican system and the birth of a closed oligarchy", but in actual fact, the effects of these reforms were broadly beneficial, and spared Venice the bitter factional rivalries that consumed the other Italian cities. Unlike the volatile general assembly of the people, the Great Council members were guaranteed a share in power and thus less easy to manipulate. The relatively large number of families participating in this oligarchic elite was also a peculiar feature of the Venetian state, making it both more representative, and ensuring that any rivalry between two families could be kept in check, and did not affect the nobility as a whole.

=== From the 14th century to the fall of the Republic ===
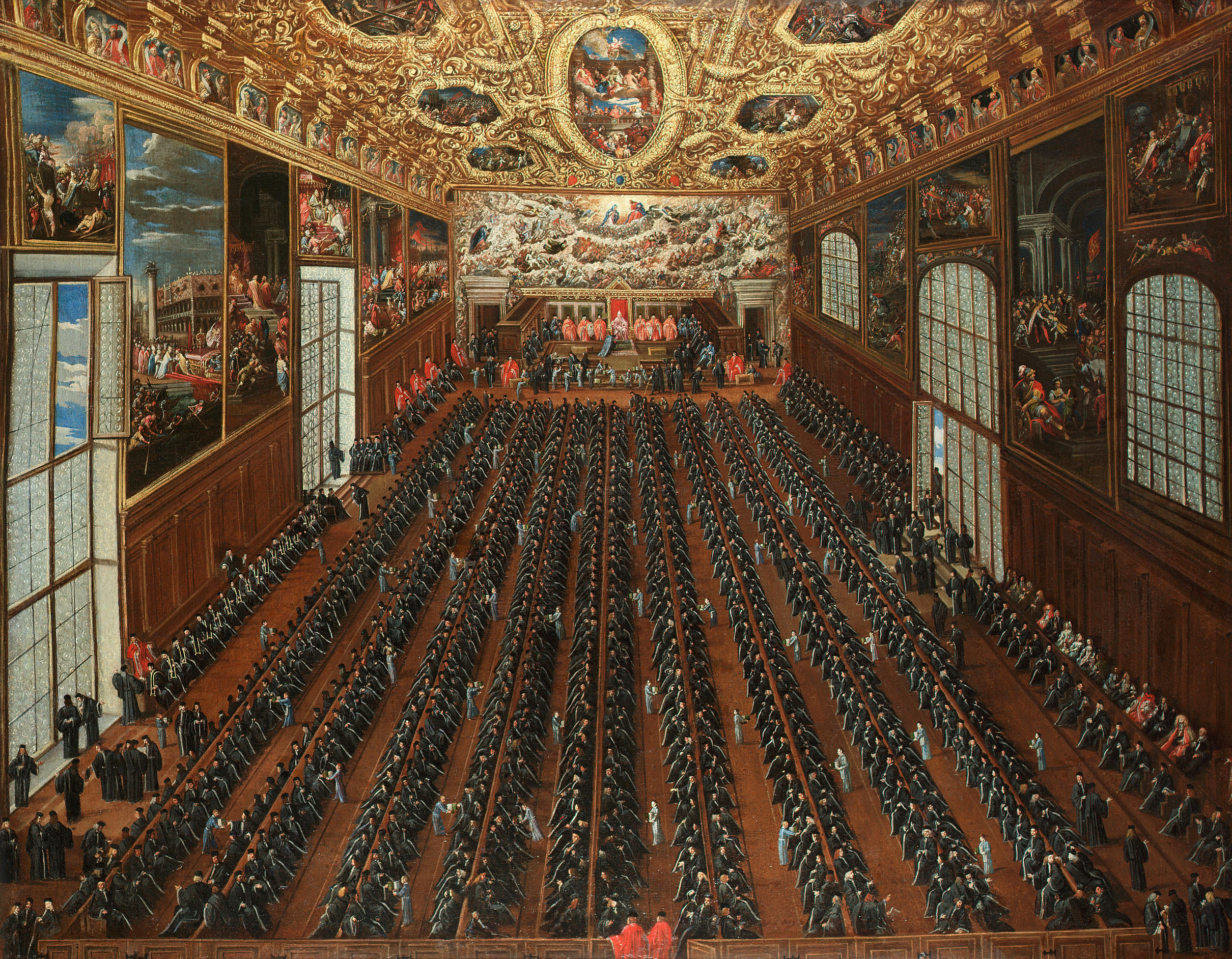
The Great Council in a voting session in the Doge's Palace, 1648/50

For the remainder of the Republic's history, the Great Council was the supreme body of the state, replacing the virtually defunct Concio, which was formally abolished in 1423. The Great Council retained its legislative authority, but many of its powers were delegated to other, smaller bodies, more capable of action. Soon, however, most of the chief functions of government, such as nominating military commanders or receiving ambassadors, were taken over by the Senate. Over the 15th and 16th centuries, the Senate also became the de facto legislative body, with, the Great Council reduced to discussing or approving measures already decided upon in the Senate, but it retained its judicial power and the authority to elect officials.

The rules of admission to the Great Council were further elaborated over time. Men born to women of lower status were banned, as were, from 1498 on, nobles who followed an ecclesiastical career. The process culminated in the establishment, in 1506 and 1526, of records of births and marriages of the nobility. Kept and maintained by the Avogadori de Comùn, this was the famous 'Golden Book' (Libro d'Oro) of the Venetian nobility. At this point, the council reached its maximum size of 2746 members.

The effect of the provisions of the Serrata had increased dramatically the number of members. In the sixteenth century, it was common for up to 2095 patricians to have the right to sit in the Ducal Palace. There was an obvious difficulty in managing such a body.

The enlargement of the body also led to the need for a larger meeting space. This need was identified already by Pietro Gradenigo, and a hall was enlarged for this purpose in the buildings lining the Molo, the embankment alongside the Doge's Palace. As the Council continued to increase in size in the early 14th century, and other magistracies were added to the government, it was decided that a new wing of the Doge's Palace be built alongside the Molo in order to house them. Due to the arrival of the Black Death, the membership of the Council declined, but building of the new hall continued, with decoration starting in 1365. It was not until c. 1420, however, that the new hall of the Great Council started being used by it. The hall was destroyed in the fire of 20 December 1577, in which the Doge's Palace suffered so much damage that for a time it was considered to tear it down and rebuild it to a new design. In the end, it was decided to restore the building, and during this time, until 30 September 1578, the Great Council met in a storage shed in the Arsenal of Venice.

In some rare cases, facing severe economic difficulties and dangers, access to the Great Council was open to new families. By means of lavish gifts to the state, this was the case at the time of the War of Chioggia and the War of Candia, when, to support the enormous cost of the wars, new wealthy families were admitted.

Another peculiarity was the creation over time of a division within the nobility itself, that is, families who were able in time to keep intact or to increase their economic capacity, and the poor ones (the so-called Barnabites). The latter may have gradually or suddenly lost their wealth, but continued to maintain the hereditary right to sit in the Great Council. This often took the two sides of the nobility to clash in council and opened the possibility to cases of vote buying.

It was the Great Council, on 12 May 1797, that declared the end of the Republic of Venice, by deciding - upon the Napoleonic invasion - to accept the abdication of the last Doge Ludovico Manin and dissolve the aristocratic assembly: despite lacking the required quorum of 600 members, the board voted overwhelmingly (512 votes in favor, 30 against, 5 abstentions) the end of the Venetian Republic and the transfer of powers to an indefinite provisional government.

== Gallery ==
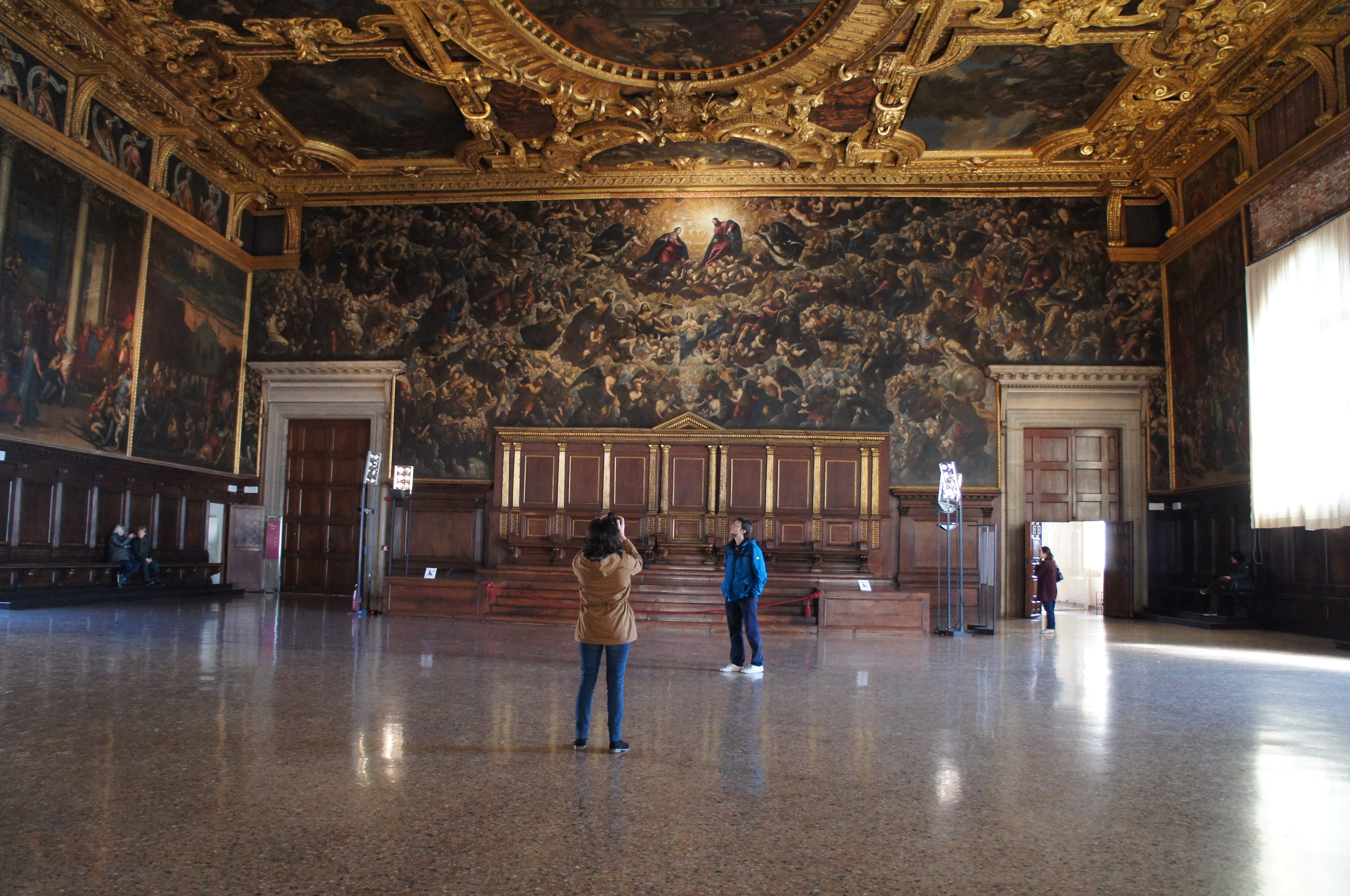
Behind the Doge’s throne, is occupied by the longest canvas painting in the world, Il Paradiso of Tintoretto

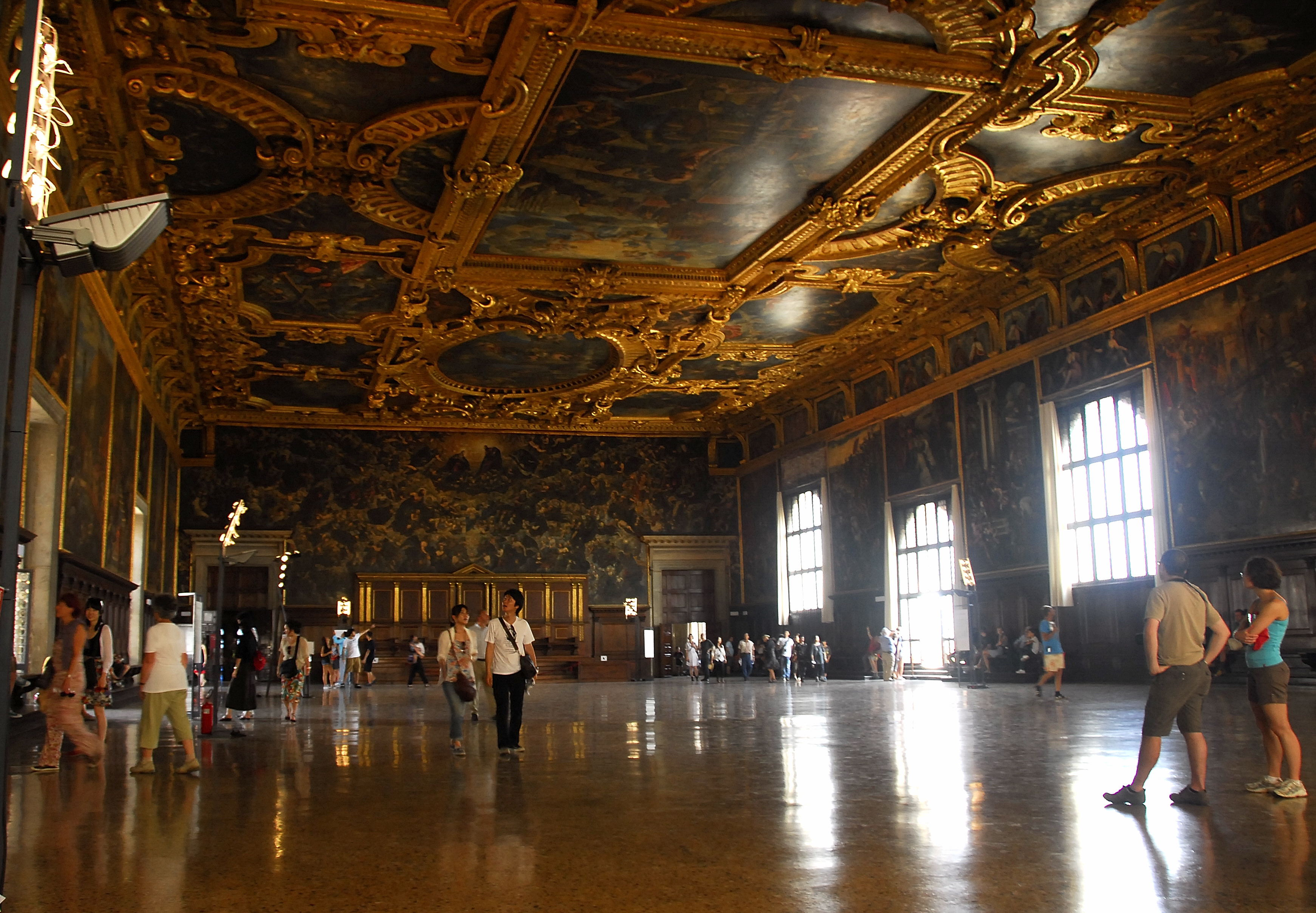

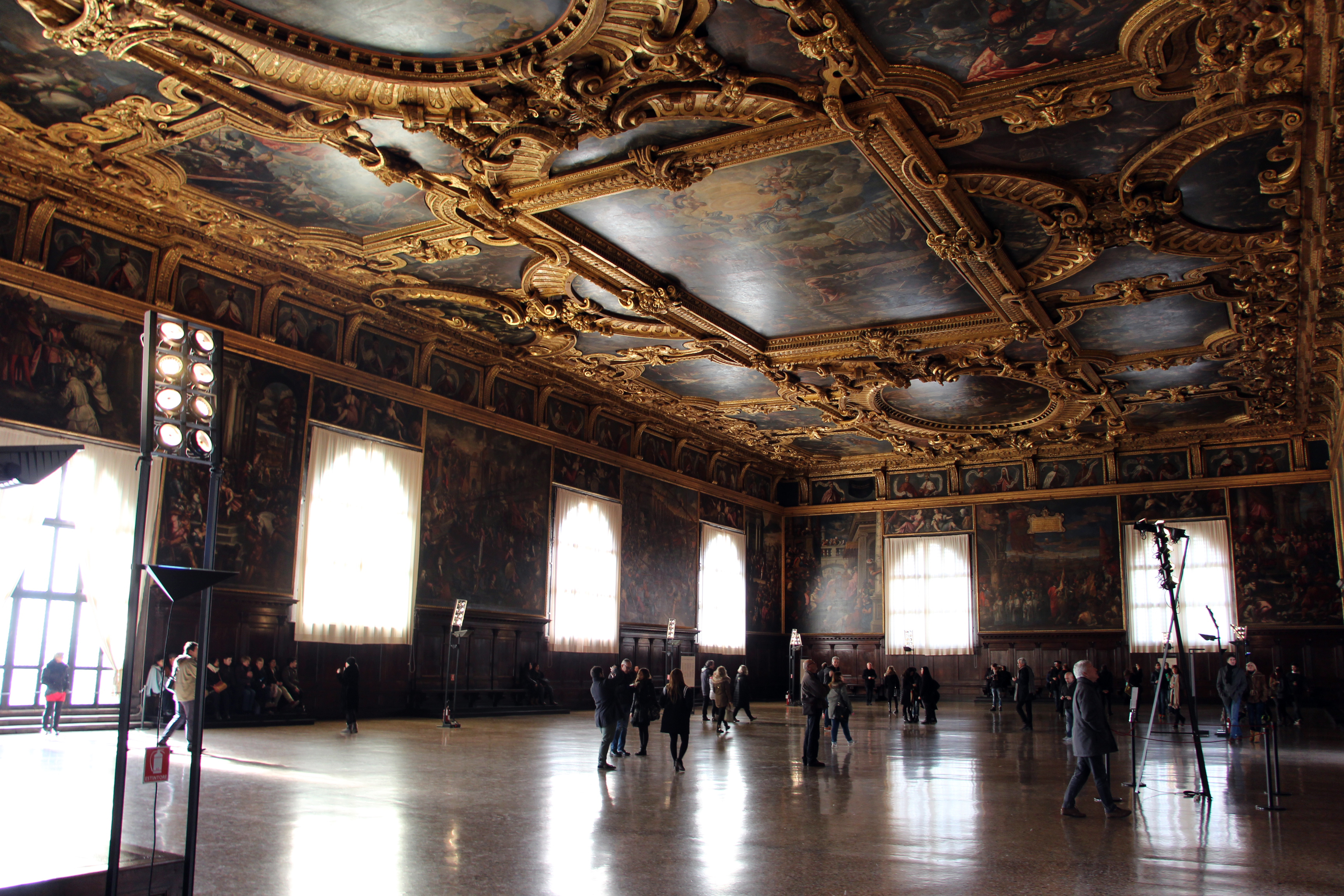

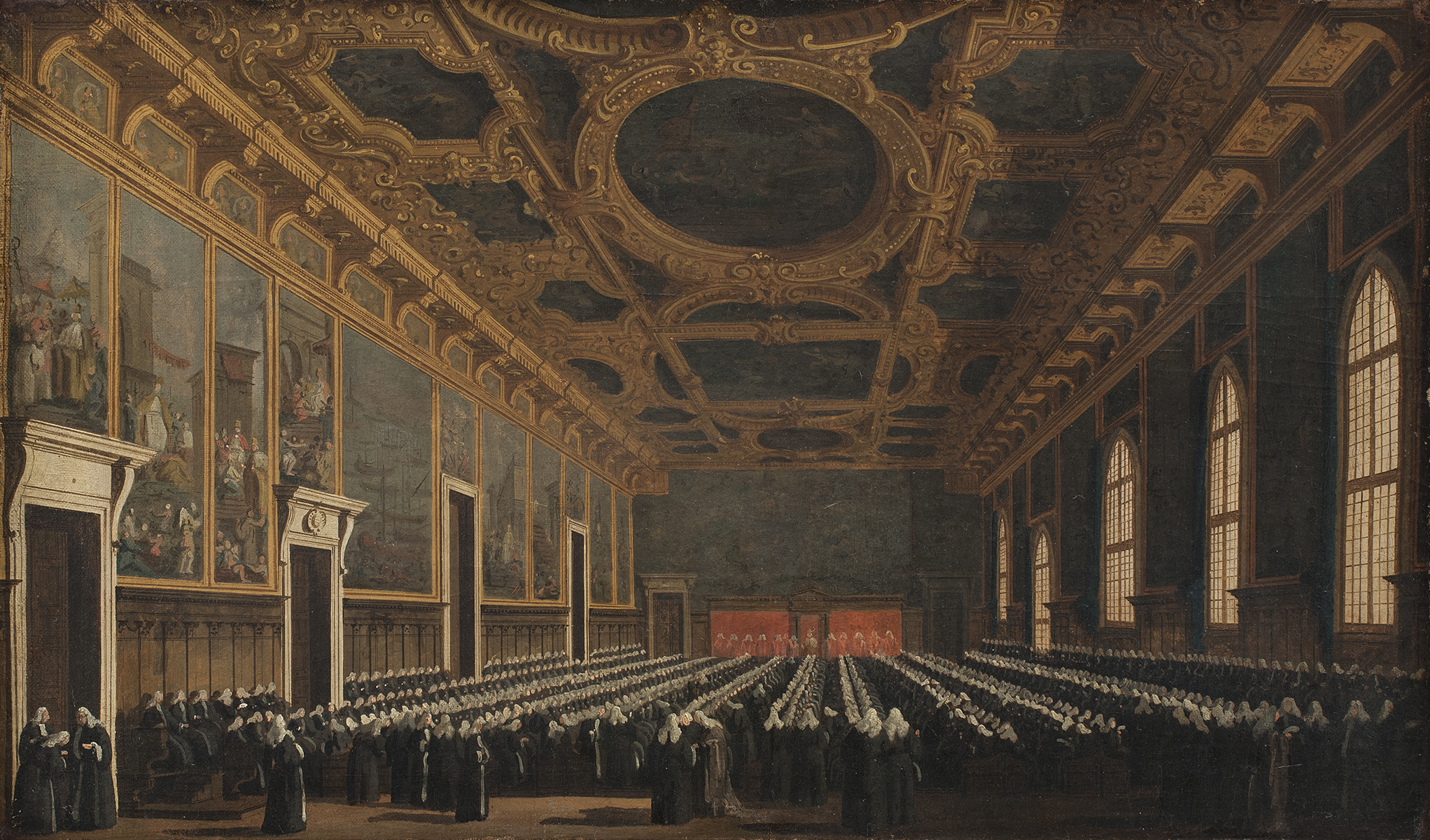

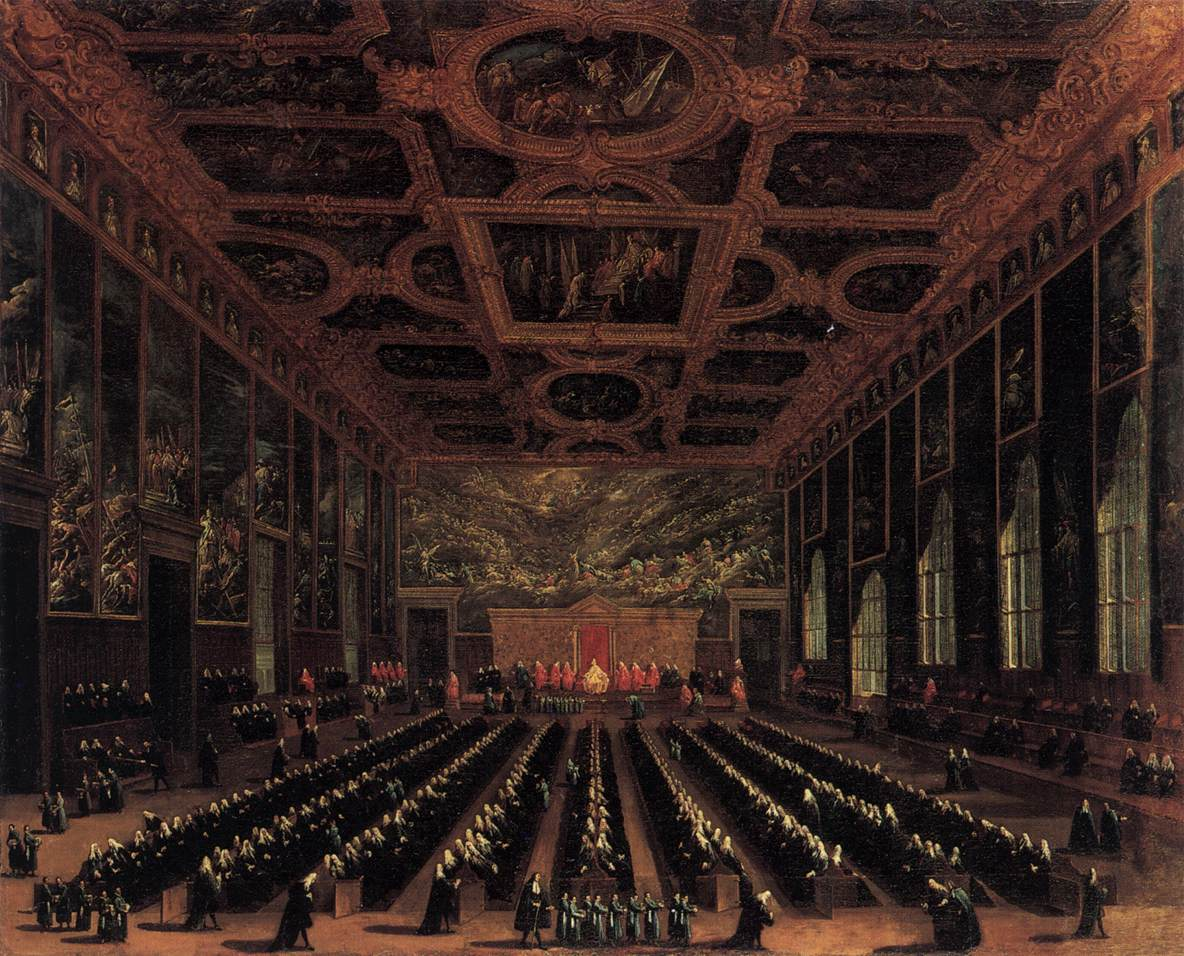

== See also ==
- Minor Council
- Council of Forty
- Signoria of Venice
- Concio (Venice)
- Serrata del Maggior Consiglio
- Venetian nobility
- Seven Noble Houses of Brussels

== Notes ==
The first volume of Annali Veneti e del Mondo written by Stefano Magno describes the origins of the Venetian noble families and presents the alphabetically arranged list with dates of their admission to Great Council.

== Sources ==
- Brown, Horatio F. (1887). Venetian Studies. London: Kegan Paul, Trench & Co. OCLC 458907462.
- Da Mosto, Andrea (1937). L'Archivio di Stato di Venezia. Indice Generale, Storico, Descrittivo ed Analitico. Tomo I: Archivi dell' Amministrazione Centrale della Repubblica Veneta e Archivi Notarili (in Italian). Rome: Biblioteca d'arte editrice. OCLC 772861816. Archived from the original on 2021-11-13.
- Lane, Frederic Chapin (1973). Venice, A Maritime Republic. Baltimore, Maryland: Johns Hopkins University Press. ISBN 0-8018-1445-6.
- Madden, Thomas F. (2012). Venice: A New History. New York: Viking Press. ISBN 978-1-101-60113-6.
