= Cristoforo Rosa =

Italian painter

Cristoforo Rosa (?? in Brescia – 1576 in Brescia) was an Italian painter of quadratura (illusionistic ceiling painting) of the Renaissance period.

In 1569, with his brother Stefano, Rosa painted the entry ceilings for the Library of St. Mark's in Venice. He died during the plague in Brescia.

Rosa's son, Pietro, became a pupil of Titian.
