= Biblioteca Marciana =

Library in Venice, Italy

Coordinates: 45°26′00″N 12°20′21″E

Marciana Library
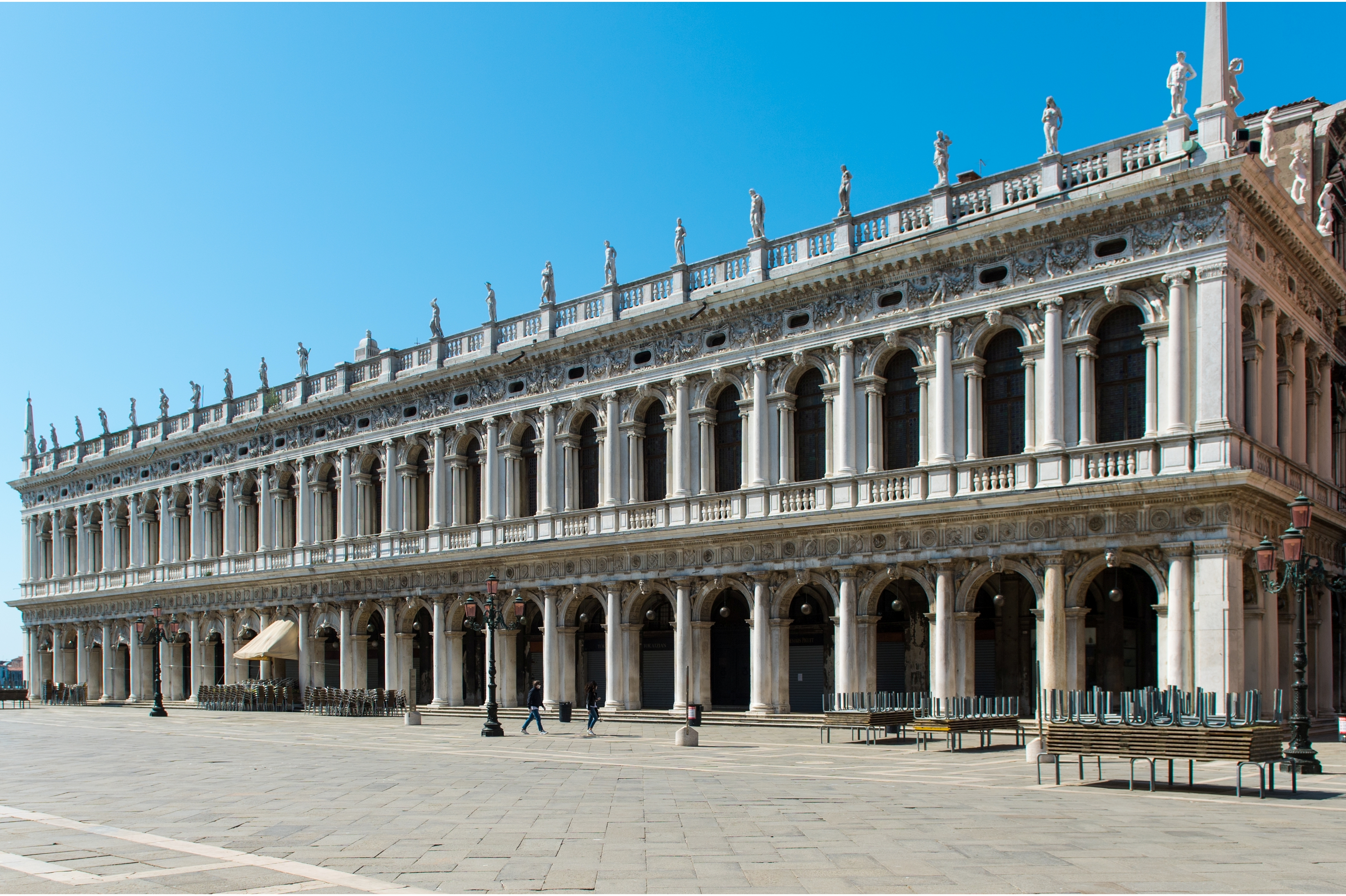
- Main façade
- Location: Saint Mark's Square; Venice, Italy
- Established: 1468

Collection
- Specialization: Classics and Venetian history
- Size: 13,117 manuscripts 2,887 incunabula 24,060 cinquecentine 1,000,000 (circa) post-sixteenth-century books
- Building details
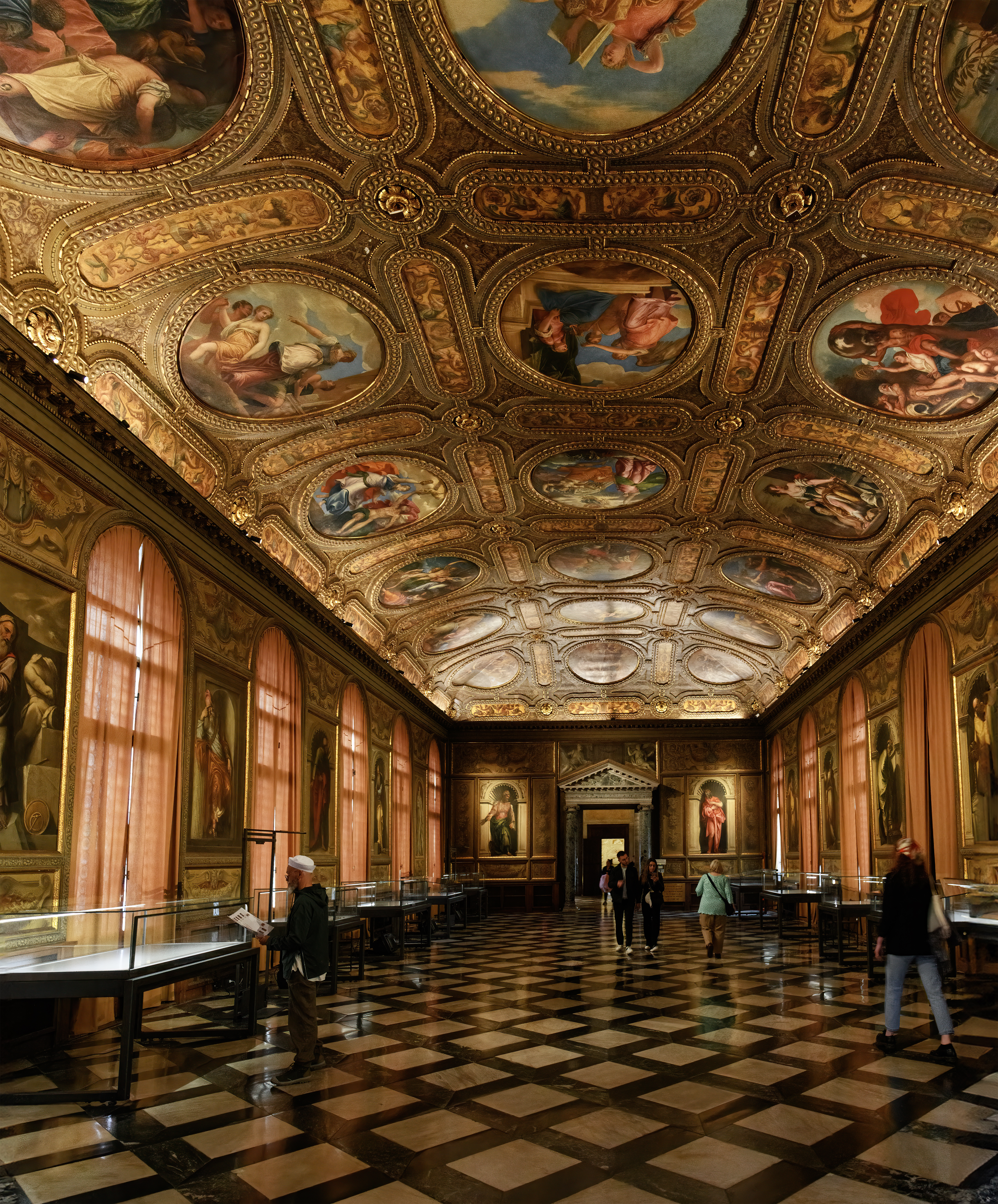
- Reading room

Design and construction
- Architects: Jacopo Sansovino
- Style: High Renaissance
- Construction: 1537–1588
- Notable artists: Titian, Tintoretto, Veronese, Battista Franco, Giuseppe Salviati, Andrea Schiavone

The Marciana Library or Library of Saint Mark (Italian: Biblioteca Marciana, but in historical documents commonly referred to as the Libreria pubblica di san Marco) is a public library in Venice, Italy. It is one of the earliest surviving public libraries and repositories for manuscripts in Italy and holds one of the world's most significant collections of classical texts. It is named after Mark the Evangelist, the patron saint of the city.

The library was founded in 1468 when the humanist scholar Cardinal Bessarion, bishop of Tusculum and titular Latin patriarch of Constantinople, donated his collection of Greek and Latin manuscripts to the Republic of Venice, with the stipulation that a library of public utility be established. The collection was the result of Bessarion's persistent efforts to locate rare manuscripts throughout Greece and Italy and then acquire or copy them as a means of preserving the writings of the classical Greek authors and the literature of Byzantium after the fall of Constantinople in 1453. His choice of Venice was primarily due to the city's large community of Greek refugees and its historical ties to the Byzantine Empire. The Venetian government was slow, however, to honour its commitment to suitably house the manuscripts with decades of discussion and indecision, owing to a series of military conflicts in the late-fifteenth and early-sixteenth centuries and the resulting climate of political uncertainty. The library was ultimately built during the period of recovery as part of a vast programme of urban renewal aimed at glorifying the republic through architecture and affirming its international prestige as a centre of wisdom and learning.

The original library building is located in Saint Mark's Square, Venice's former governmental centre, with its long façade facing the Doge's Palace. Constructed between 1537 and 1588, it is considered the masterpiece of the architect Jacopo Sansovino and a key work in Venetian Renaissance architecture. The Renaissance architect Andrea Palladio described it as "perhaps the richest and most ornate building that there has been since ancient times up until now" ("il più ricco ed ornato edificio che forse sia stato da gli Antichi in qua"). The art historian Jacob Burckhardt regarded it as "the most magnificent secular Italian building" ("das prächtigste profane Gebäude Italiens"), and Frederick Hartt called it "one of the most satisfying structures in Italian architectural history". Also significant for its art, the library holds many works by the great painters of sixteenth-century Venice, making it a comprehensive monument to Venetian Mannerism.

Today, the building is customarily referred to as the 'Libreria sansoviniana' and is largely a museum. Since 1904, the library offices, the reading rooms, and most of the collection have been housed in the adjoining Zecca, the former mint of the Republic of Venice. The library is now formally known as the Biblioteca nazionale Marciana. It is the only official institution established by the Venetian Republican government that survives and continues to function.

== Historical background ==
Cathedral libraries and monastic libraries were the principal centres of study and learning throughout Italy in the Middle Ages. But beginning in the fifteenth century, the humanist emphasis on the knowledge of the classical world as essential to the formation of the Renaissance man led to a proliferation of court libraries, patronized by princely rulers, several of which provided a degree of public access. In Venice, an early attempt to found a public library in emulation of the great libraries of Antiquity was unsuccessful, as Petrarch's personal collection of manuscripts, donated to the republic in 1362, was dispersed at the time of his death.

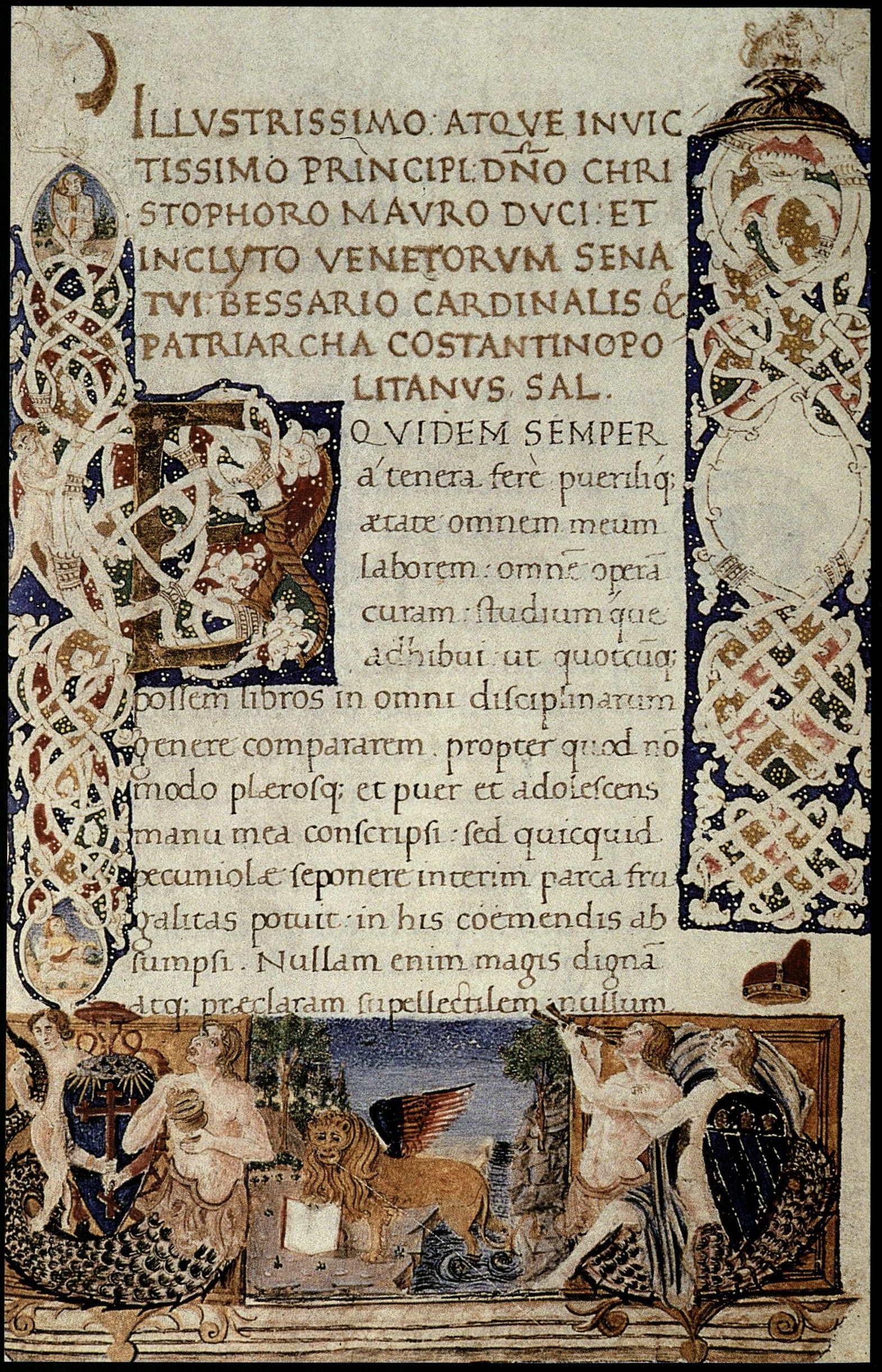
Cardinal Bessarion's letter to Doge Cristoforo Moro and the Senate of Venice, announcing the donation of his library. BNM Lat. XIV, 14 (= 4235), fol. 1r.

In 1468, the Byzantine humanist and scholar Cardinal Bessarion donated his collection of 482 Greek and 264 Latin codices to the Republic of Venice, stipulating that a public library be established to ensure their conservation for future generations and availability for scholars. (Note: Bessarion's private library was among the most important in the fifteenth century. In 1455, the collection of Pope Nicholas V, the largest, contained 1209 codices. Significant private libraries belonged to Niccolò Niccoli (808 volumes) and Coluccio Salutati (circa 800 volumes). Among the larger court libraries were those of the Visconti (998 volumes in 1426), Federico da Montefeltro (772 volumes), the Estensi (512 volumes in 1495), and the Gonzaga (circa 300 codices in 1407). With regard to the Greek codices, Bessarion's personal library was unrivaled in Western Europe. The Vatican collection, the second largest, included 414 Greek codices in 1455. See Zorzi, Biblioteca Marciana, p. 20.) The formal letter announcing the donation, dated 31 May 1468 and addressed to Doge Cristoforo Moro (in office 1462–1471) and the Senate, narrates that following the fall of Constantinople in 1453 and its devastation by the Turks, Bessarion had set ardently about the task of acquiring the rare and important works of ancient Greece and Byzantium and adding them to his existing collection so as to prevent the further dispersal and total loss of Greek culture. The cardinal's stated desire in offering the manuscripts to Venice specifically was that they should be properly conserved in a city where many Greek refugees had fled and which he himself had come to consider "another Byzantium" ("alterum Byzantium"). (Note: The formal letter announcing the donation is preserved in Biblioteca Nazionale Marciana ms Lat. XIV, 14 (=4235) and is on-line at Internet Culturale. The documents relative to the donation are transcribed in Labowsky, Bessarion's Library..., pp. 147–156.) (Note: The legal act of donation preceded the formal announcement and is dated 14 May 1468. See Labowsky, Bessarion's Library..., p. 27, 153–156 and Zorzi, La libreria di san Marco..., p. 82.)

Bessarion's first contact with Venice had been in 1438 when, as the newly ordained metropolitan bishop of Nicaea, he arrived with the Byzantine delegation to the Council of Ferrara-Florence, the objective being to heal the schism between the Catholic and Orthodox churches and unite Christendom against the Ottoman Turks. His travels as envoy to Germany for Pope Pius II brought him briefly to the city again in 1460 and 1461. (Note: For a detailed discussion of Bessarion's legation to Germany and the attempts to raise troops for a crusade, see Kenneth M. Setton, The Papacy and the Levant (1204–1571), vol. II, The Fifteenth Century (Philadelphia: The American Philosophical Society, 1978), pp. 213–218, ISBN 0871691272.) On 20 December 1461, during the second stayover, he was admitted into the Venetian aristocracy with a seat in the Great Council. (Note: The deliberation of the Great Council is in the State Archives of Venice in Grazie Maggior Consiglio, fol. 75v (in Avogaria di Comun, b. 168, fasc. 6).)

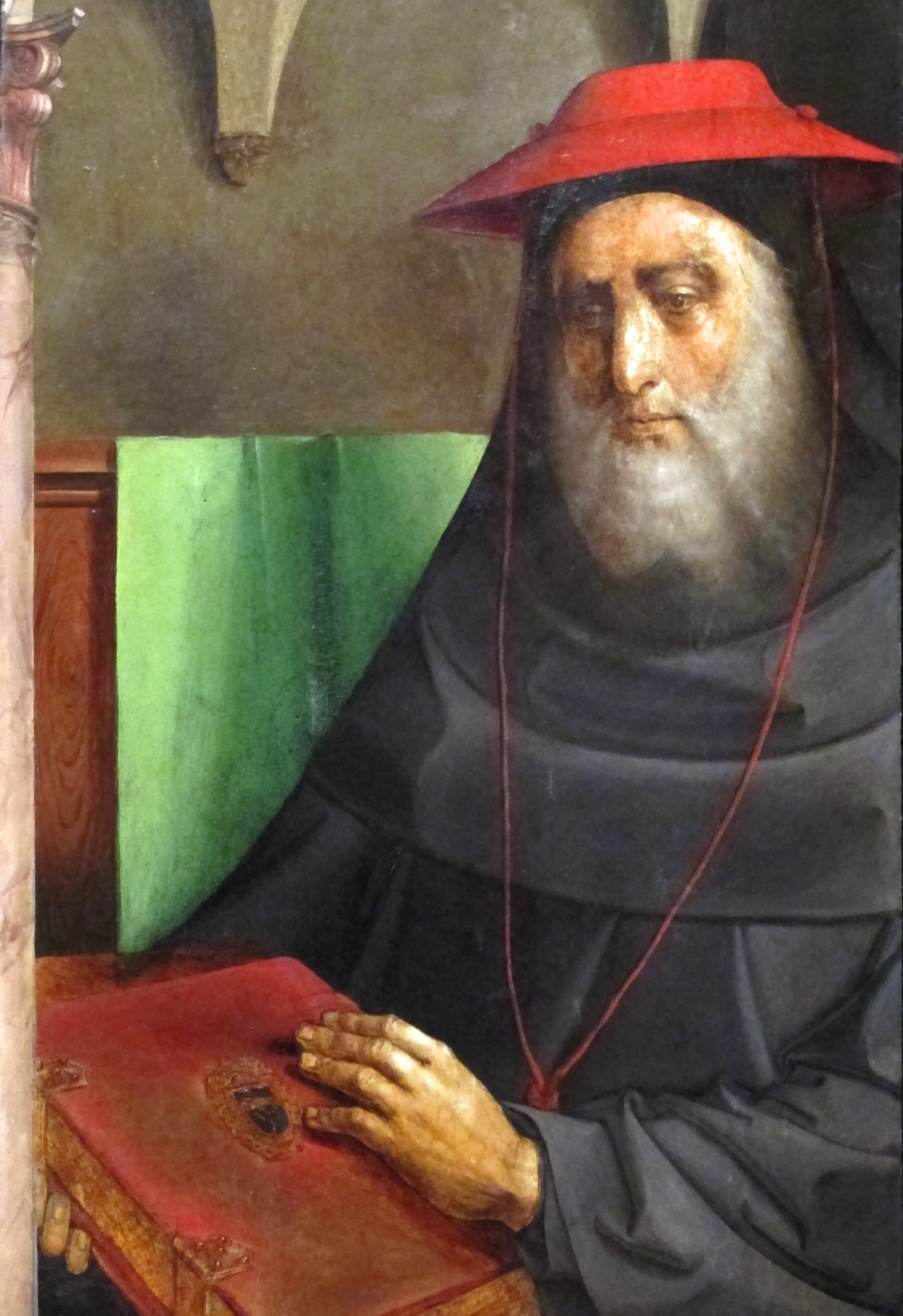
Justus van Gent, Portrait of Cardinal Bessarion (c. 1473–1476). Bessarion was created cardinal on 8 January 1440 by Pope Eugene IV.

In 1463, Bessarion returned to Venice as the papal legate, tasked with negotiating the republic's participation in a crusade to liberate Constantinople from the Turks. For the duration of this extended sojourn (1463–1464), the cardinal lodged and studied in the Benedictine monastery of San Giorgio Maggiore, and it was to the monastery that he initially destined his Greek codices which were to be consigned after his death. But under the influence of the humanist Paolo Morosini and his cousin Pietro, the Venetian ambassador to Rome, Bessarion annulled the legal act of donation in 1467 with papal consent, citing the difficulty readers would have had in reaching the monastery, located on a separate island. (Note: The terms of Bessarion's original act of donation to the monastery of San Giorgio (untraced) are recorded in the papal bull authorizing the revocation that Pope Paul II issued on 16 September 1467. The text of the bull is published in G. Nicoletti, 'Bolla di Paolo II ed istrumento di donazione fatta della propria libreria dal cardinale Bessarione ai procuratori di s. Marco', Archivio Storico Italiano, Serie terza, Vol. 9, No. 2, 54 (1869), pp. 195–197. Also, abbreviated, in Pittoni, La libreria di san Marco, pp. 14–15 (note 1).) The following year, Bessarion announced instead his intention to bequeath his entire personal library, both the Greek and Latin codices, to the Republic of Venice with immediate effect. (Note: Marino Zorzi attributes the sense of urgency in Bessarion's donation to the conspiracy to assassinate Pope Paul II in February 1468 and the resulting arrest, imprisonment, and torture of several noted Roman humanists, members of the Academy of Julius Pomponius Laetus, who were largely associated with Bessarion's own intellectual circle. There were additional charges of heresy that reflected the pope's deep aversion to Platonism, secular poetry, rhetoric, and astrology. Zorzi argues that in this climate of suspicion and repression, Bessarion would have been anxious to quickly remove his library to safety, outside the territory of the Papal States. See Zorzi, La libreria di san Marco..., pp. 80–82. For a detailed discussion of the assassination plot against Paul II, see Anthony F. D'Elia, A Sudden Terror: The Plot to Murder the Pope in Renaissance Rome (Cambridge, MA: Harvard University Press, 2009) ISBN 0674061810. For Paul II's relationship with Humanism, see A. J. Dunston, 'Pope Paul II and the Humanists', Journal of Religious History, 7 (1983), pp. 287–306 ISSN 1467-9809.)

On 26 June 1468, Pietro Morosini took legal possession of Bessarion's library in Rome on behalf of the republic. The bequest included the 466 codices which were transported to Venice in crates the next year. (Note: The full inventory is published in Labowsky, Bessarion's Library..., pp. 157–188.) (Note: In the preliminary letter of acceptance, the Senate valued the manuscripts at 15,000 ducats. The letter, dated 23 March 1468, is published in Labowsky, Bessarion's Library..., p. 124. For Bartolomeo Platina, Bessarion's precious codices had cost 30,000 golden scudo. See Bartolomeo Platina, Panegyricus in Bessarionem doctiss. partriarcham Constantin (Colonia: Eucharius Cervicornus, 1529) p. [9]. Regardless of the differing figures, the value was considerable: from several contemporary contracts, a well-paid professor earned 120 ducats a year. See Zorzi, La Libreria di San Marco..., p. 60.) To this initial delivery, more codices and incunabula were added following the death of Bessarion in 1472. This second shipment, arranged in 1474 by Federico da Montefeltro, departed from Urbino, where Bessarion had deposited the remainder of his library for safekeeping. It included the books that the cardinal had reserved for himself or had acquired after 1468.

Despite the grateful acceptance of the donation by the Venetian government and the commitment to establish a library of public utility, the codices remained crated inside the Doge's Palace, entrusted to the care of the state historian under the direction of the procurators of Saint Mark de supra. Little was done to facilitate access, particularly during the years of the conflict against the Ottomans (1463–1479) when time and resources were directed towards the war effort. In 1485, the need to provide greater space for governmental activities led to the decision to compress the crates into a smaller area of the palace where they were stacked, one atop the other. Access became more difficult and on-site consultation impracticable. Although codices were periodically loaned, primarily to learned members of the Venetian nobility and academics, the requirement to deposit a security was not always enforced. (Note: Bessarion stipulated in the act of donation that the codices were to be available for loan, with the requirement that a security be deposited in the amount of twice the value of the codex. See Zorzi, La libreria di san Marco..., p. 83.) A few of the codices were subsequently discovered in private libraries or even for sale in local book shops. In exceptional circumstances, copyists were allowed to duplicate the manuscripts for the private libraries of influential patrons: among others Lorenzo de' Medici commissioned copies of seven Greek codices. During this period, reproduction of the manuscripts was rarely authorized for printers who needed working copies on which to write notes and make corrections whenever printing critical editions, since it was believed that the value of a manuscript would greatly decline once the editio princeps (first edition) had been published. (Note: Senator Domenico Malipiero objected to expenditures for the construction of the library on the basis that the codices would have little value once the texts had been printed. This opinion persisted. In 1541, the Avogador Bernardo Zorzi criticized the ease with which copies were made on the grounds that they diminished the value and importance of the originals. Aldus Manutius himself wrote that the examples given to printers were destined to be torn up. See Zorzi, La libreria di san Marco..., pp. 92–93.) Notably, Aldus Manutius was able to make only limited use of the codices for his publishing house. (Note: The Aldine editions of Xenophon's Hellenica (1502) and Plutarch's Moralia (1509) were based on Bessarion's codices. The manuscripts were also consulted for the works by Aristotle published between 1495 and 1498. See Zorzi, La libreria di san Marco..., p. 93)

Several prominent humanists, including Marcantonio Sabellico in his capacity as official historian and Bartolomeo d'Alviano, urged the government over time to provide a more suitable location, but to no avail. The political and financial situation during the long years of the Italian Wars stymied any serious plan to do so, notwithstanding the Senate's statement of intent in 1515 to build a library. (Note: The deliberation of the Senate appropriated no funding and was without effect. It nevertheless constitutes the first proposal to construct a library rather than to simply find a suitable location for the collection. The deliberation of the Senate, dated 5 May 1515, is published in Labowsky, Bessarion's Library..., pp. 130–131.) Access to the collection itself was nevertheless improved after the appointment of Andrea Navagero as official historian and gubernator (curator) of the collection. During Navagero's tenure (1516–1524), scholars made greater use of the manuscripts and copyists were authorized with more frequency to reproduce codices for esteemed patrons, including Pope Leo X, King Francis I of France, and Cardinal Thomas Wolsey, Lord High Chancellor of England. More editions of the manuscripts were published in this period, notably by Manutius' heirs. With the nomination of Pietro Bembo as gubernator in 1530 and the termination of the War of the League of Cognac in that same year, efforts to gather support for the construction of the library were renewed. Probably at the instigation of Bembo, an enthusiast of classical studies, the collection was transferred in 1532 to the upper floor of the Church of Saint Mark, the ducal chapel, where the codices were uncrated and placed on shelves. That same year, Vettore Grimani pressed his fellow procurators, insisting that the time had come to act on the republic's long-standing intention to construct a public library wherein Bessarion's codices could be housed. (Note: The record of the procurators’ proceedings is published in Labowsky, Bessarion's Library..., p. 132.)

== Building ==
=== Construction ===
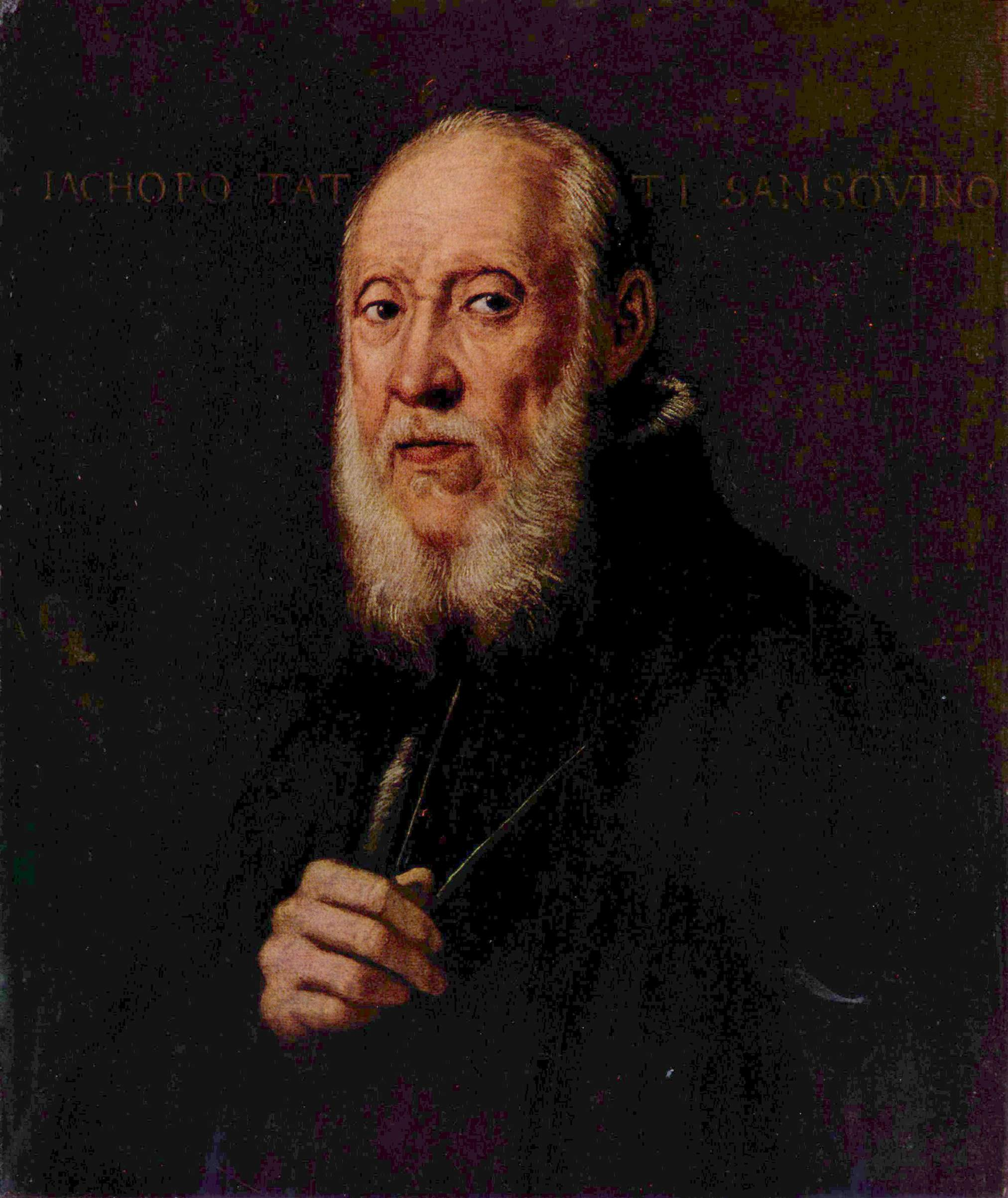
Tintoretto, Portrait of Jacopo Sansovino (c. 1566)

Saint Mark's Square

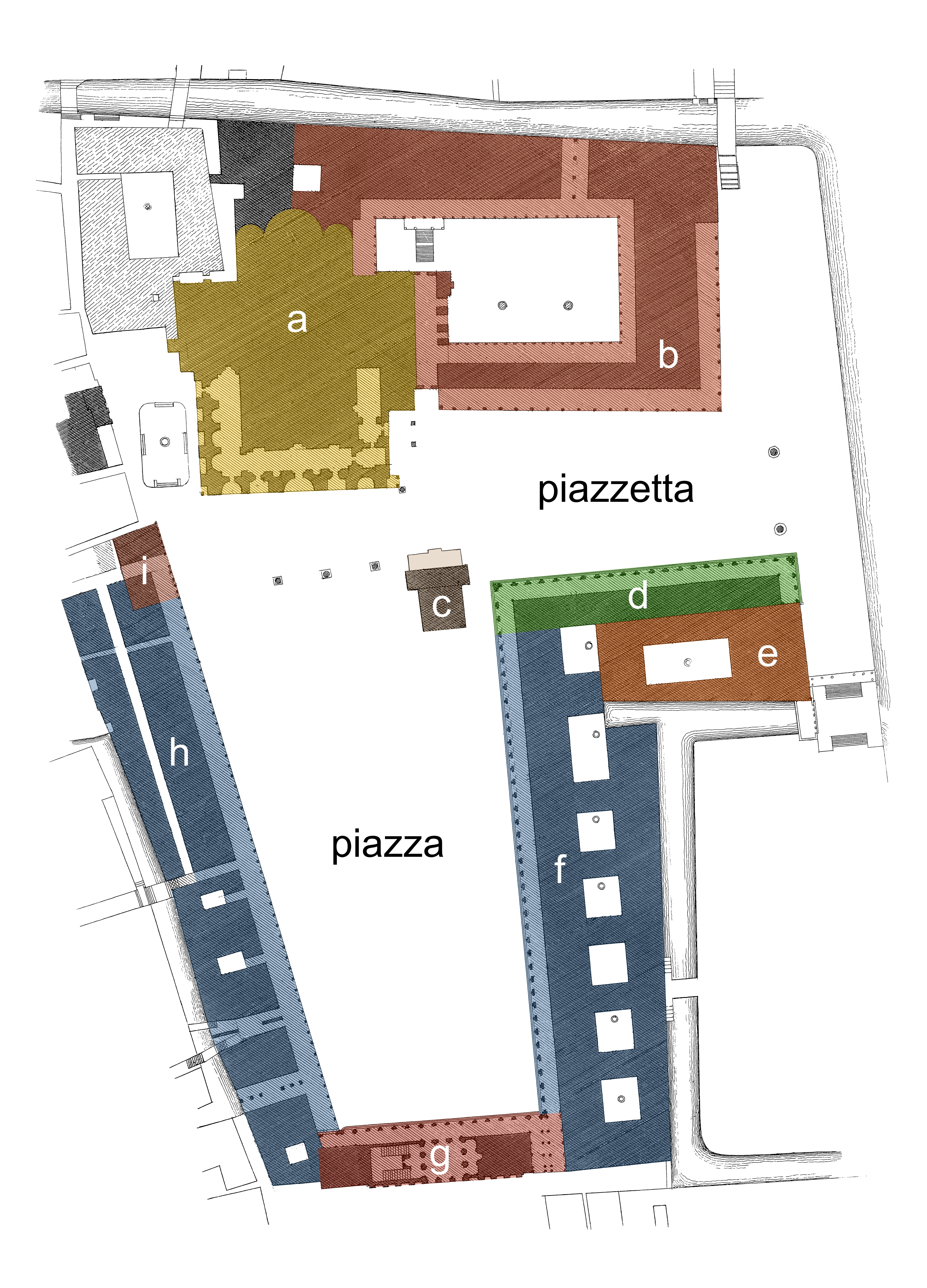
a. St Mark's Basilica
b. Doge's Palace
c. Bell tower and Loggetta
d. Marciana Library
e. Mint
f. Procuratie Nuove
g. Napoleonic wing
h. Procuratie Vecchie
i. Clock tower

The construction of the library was an integral part of the Renovatio urbis (renewal of the city), a vast architectural programme begun under Doge Andrea Gritti (in office 1523–1538). The programme was intended to heighten Venetian self-confidence and reaffirm the republic's international prestige after the earlier defeat at Agnadello during the War of Cambrai and the subsequent Peace of Bologna, which sanctioned Habsburg hegemony on the Italian peninsula at the end of the War of the League of Cognac. Championed by the Grimani family, it called for the transformation of Saint Mark's Square from a medieval town centre with food vendors, money changers, and even latrines into a classical forum. The intent was to evoke the memory of the ancient Roman Republic and, in the aftermath of the Sack of Rome in 1527, to present Venice as Rome's true successor. This would visually substantiate Venetian claims that, despite the republic's relative loss of political influence, its longevity and stability were assured by its constitutional structure, consisting in a mixed government modelled along the lines of the classical republics. (Note: The customary interpretation of Venice as an example of the mixed government was that the monarchical element was identifiable in the doge, the aristocratic element in the Senate, and the democratic element in the Great Council. See John G. A. Pocock, The Machiavellian Moment: Florentine Political Thought and the Atlantic Republican Tradition (Princeton: Princeton University Press, 1975), pp. 311–312.)

Monumental in scale, the architectural programme was one of the most ambitious projects of urban renewal in sixteenth-century Italy. In addition to the mint (begun 1536) and the loggia of the bell tower of Saint Mark's (begun 1538), it involved replacing the dilapidated thirteenth-century buildings that lined the southern side of the square and the area in front of the Doge's Palace. For this, the procurators of Saint Mark de supra commissioned Jacopo Sansovino, their proto (consultant architect and buildings manager), on 14 July 1536. A refugee from the Sack of Rome, Sansovino possessed the direct knowledge and understanding of ancient Roman prototypes necessary to carry out the architectural programme.

The commission called for a model of a three-storey building, but the project was radically transformed. On 6 March 1537, it was decided that the construction of the new building, now with only two storeys, would be limited to the section directly in front of the palace and that the upper floor was to be reserved for the offices of the procurators and the library. (Note: The deliberation of the procurators is in the State Archives of Venice (PS, Atti, reg. 125, c. 2) and is published in Howard, Jacopo Sansovino..., p. 163.) This would not only satisfy the terms of the donation, it would bring renown to the republic as a centre of wisdom, learning, and culture. Significantly, the earlier decree of 1515, citing as examples the libraries in Rome and in Athens, expressly stated that a perfect library with fine books would serve as an ornament for the city and as a light for all of Italy. (Note: Fragmentary descriptions of ancient libraries survive in classical literary sources. See Howard, Jacopo Sansovino..., pp. 26 (notes 99 and 100 for bibliographical references). It has been suggested that specifically Pausanias' description of Hadrian's Library in Athens may have served as an architectural prototype for the Marciana Library in consideration of the columns and gilded ceiling. The orientation of the library with the reading room facing east may have been influenced by Vitruvius' recommendation in De architectura (VI,4,1). See Hartt, History of Italian Renaissance Art, p. 633.)

==== Sansovino's superintendence (1537–c. 1560) ====
Construction proceeded slowly. The chosen site for the library, although owned by the government, was occupied by five hostelries (Pellegrino, Rizza, Cavaletto, Luna, Lion) and several food stalls, many of which had long-standing contractual rights. It was thus necessary to find a mutually agreed upon alternative location, and at least three of the hostelries had to remain in the area of Saint Mark's Square. In addition, the hostelries and shops provided a steady flow of rental income to the procurators of Saint Mark de supra, the magistrates responsible for the public buildings around Saint Mark's Square. So there was the need to limit the disruption of the revenue by gradually relocating the activities as the building progressed and new space was required to continue.

Construction of the
Marciana Library

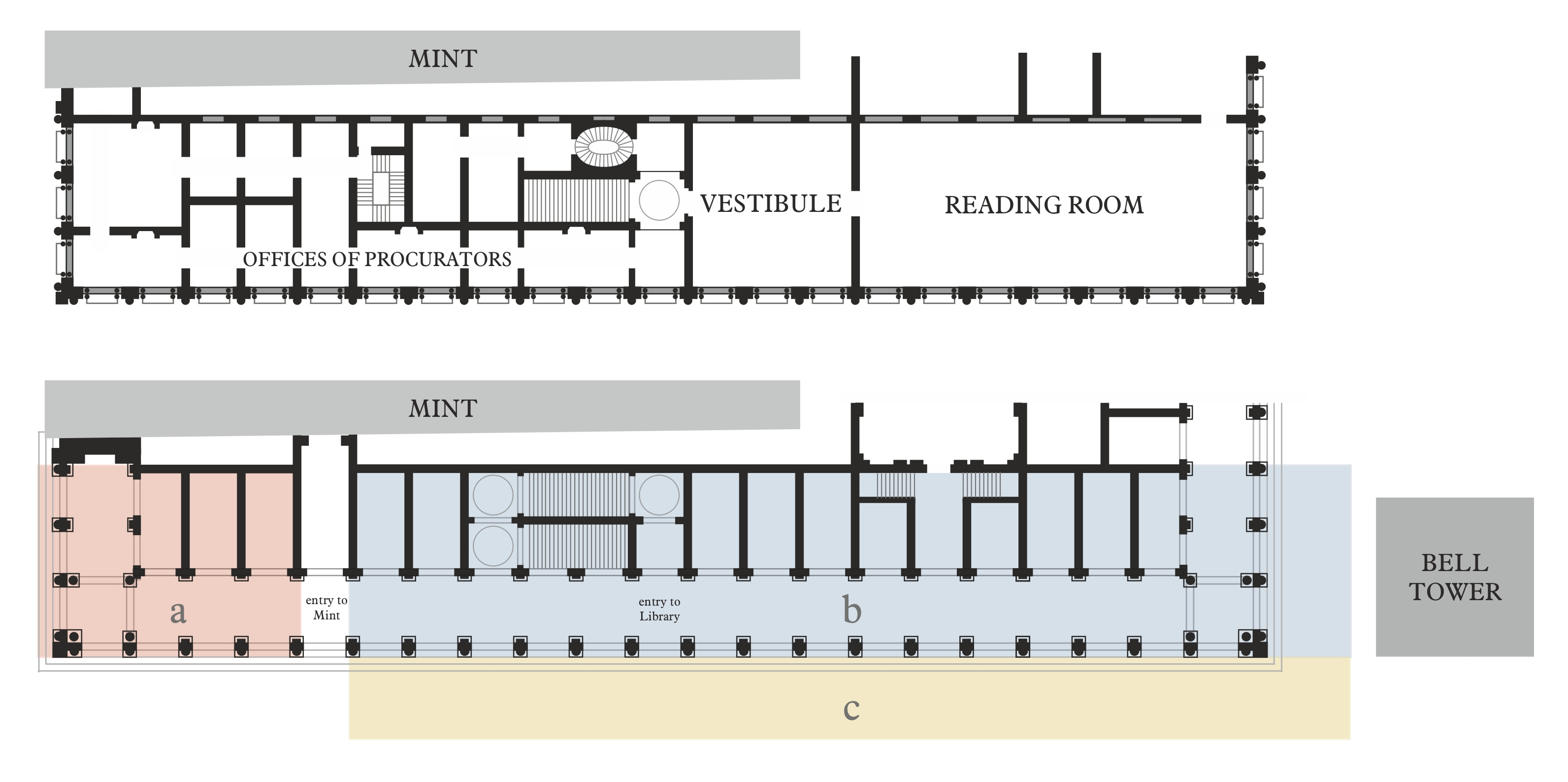
a. area of meat market
b. area of hostelries
c. area of lean-to bread shops

The lean-to bread shops and a portion of the Pellegrino hostelry adjoining the bell tower were demolished in early 1537. But rather than reutilizing the existing foundations, Sansovino built the library detached so as to make the bell tower a freestanding structure and transform Saint Mark's Square into a trapezoid. This was intended to give greater visual importance to the Church of Saint Mark located on the eastern side.

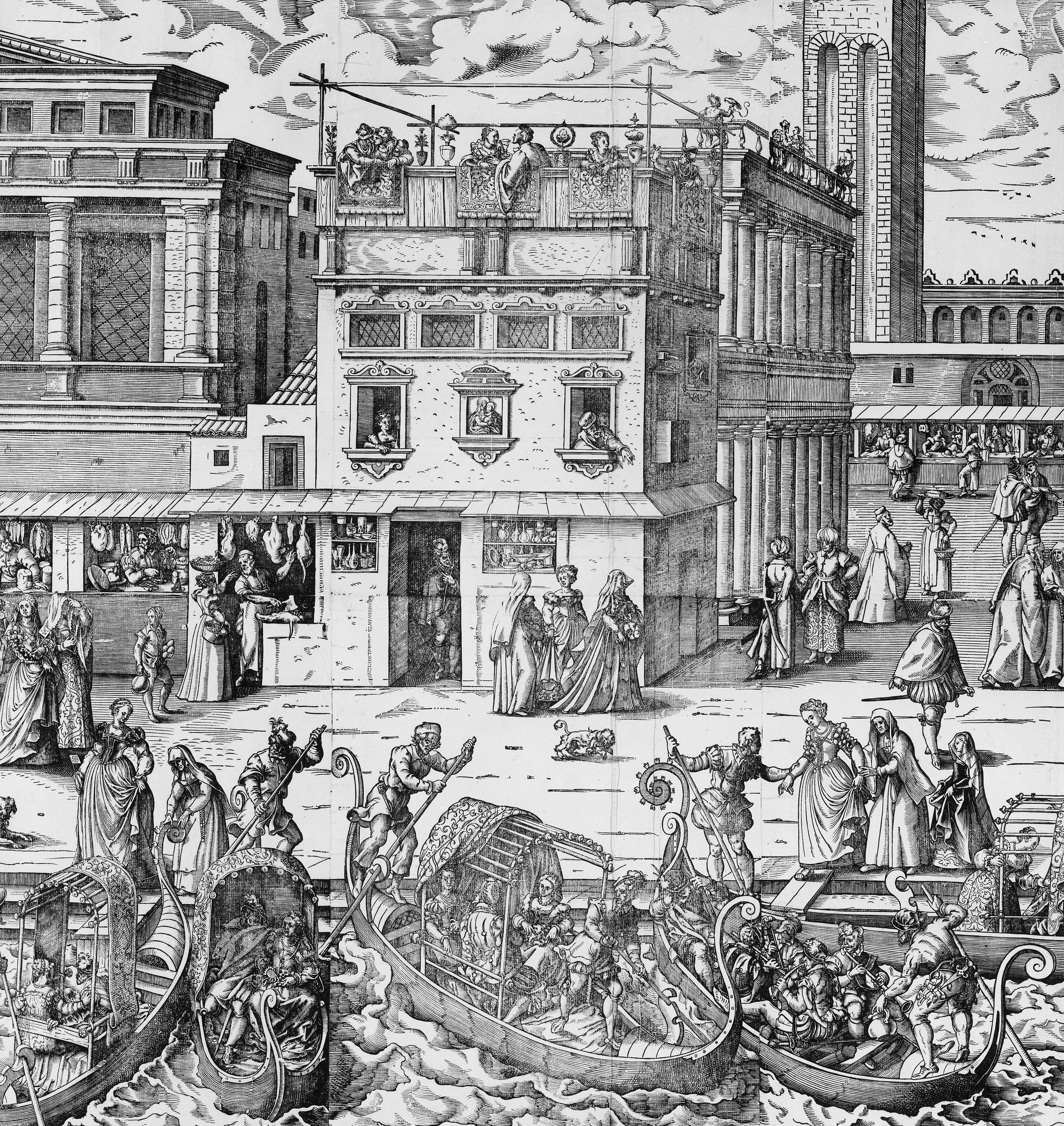
Jost Amman, Procession for the Doge's Marriage with the Sea (detail), showing the meat market in the foreground and the unfinished library behind (c. 1565)

Work was suspended following the Ottoman–Venetian War (1537–1540) due to lack of funding but resumed in 1543. The next year, 1544, the rest of the Pellegrino hostelry was torn down, followed by the Rizza. On 18 December 1545, the heavy masonry vault collapsed. In the subsequent enquiry, Sansovino claimed that workmen had prematurely removed the temporary wooden supports before the concrete had set and that a galley in the basin of Saint Mark, firing her cannon as a salute, had shaken the building. Nevertheless, the architect was sentenced to personally repay the cost of the damage, which took him 20 years. (Note: In 1565, the procurators discharged the remaining debt in exchange for sculptural work by Sansovino. The deliberation of the procurators, dated 20 March 1565, is in the State Archives of Venice (PS, Atti, reg. 130, c. 72). See Howard, Jacopo Sansovino..., p. 21.) Further, his stipend was suspended until 1547. As a consequence of the collapse, the design was modified with a lighter wooden structure to support the roof.

In the following years, the procurators increased funding by borrowing from trust funds, recovering unpaid rents, selling unprofitable holdings, and drawing upon the interest income from government bonds. Work proceeded rapidly thereafter. The Cavaletto hostelry was relocated in 1550. This was followed by the demolition of the Luna. By 1552, at least the seven bays in correspondence to the reading room, had been completed. (Note: In 1552, the practice began of extracting by lot the use of the balconies by the procurators and their guests to observe the carnival celebrations in the Piazzetta. That year, seven balconies were awarded. See Howard, Jacopo Sansovino..., p. 21 and Morresi, Jacopo Sansovino, p. 202.) The commemorative plaque in the adjacent vestibule, corresponding to the next three bays, bears the date of the Venetian year 1133 (i.e. 1554), (Note: The Venetian year was calculated beginning with AD 421, the legendary year of the city's foundation on 25 March. See Edward Muir, Civic Ritual in Renaissance Venice (Princeton: Princeton University Press, 1981), pp. 70–72.) an indication that the end of construction was already considered imminent. By then, fourteen bays had been constructed. However, owing to difficulties in finding a suitable alternative location, only in 1556 was the last of the hostelries, the Lion, relocated, allowing the building to reach the sixteenth bay in correspondence with the lateral entry of the mint. Beyond stood the central meat market. This was a significant source of rental income for the procurators, and construction was halted. The work on the interior decorations continued until about 1560. Although it was decided five years later to relocate the meat market and continue the building, no further action was taken, and in 1570 Sansovino died.

==== Scamozzi's superintendence (1582–1588) ====
The meat market was demolished in 1581. The following year Vincenzo Scamozzi was selected to oversee the construction of the final five bays, continuing Sansovino's design for the façade. This brought the building down to the embankment of Saint Mark's Basin and into alignment with the main façade of the mint. Scamozzi added the crowning statues and obelisks. (Note: Only one statue had been placed during Sansovino's superintendence. See Ivanoff, 'La libreria marciana...', p. 8.) Since the original plans by Sansovino do not survive, it is not known whether the architect intended for the library to reach the final length of twenty-one bays. Scamozzi's negative comment on the junction of the library with the mint has led some architectural historians to argue that the result could not have been intentionally designed by Sansovino. (Note: Scamozzi criticizes the truncating of cornices, bases, and capitals in reference to the junction of the facades of the library and the mint and considers such solutions "indecencies and follies" ("indecentie e sciocchezze"). See Vincenzo Scamozzi, L'idea della architettura universale di Vincenzo Scamozzi architetto veneto (Venetiis: Giorgio Valentini, 1615), Parte seconda, p. 171.) However archival research and technical and aesthetic assessments have not been conclusive. (Note: The issue is summarized in Deborah Howard, 'The Length of the Library', Ateneo veneto, Anno CXCVII, terza serie, 9/11 (2010), pp. 23–29, ISSN 0004-6558.)

During Scamozzi's superintendence, the debate regarding the height of the building was reopened. When Sansovino was first commissioned on 14 July 1536, the project expressly called for a three-storey construction similar to the recently rebuilt Procuratie Vecchie on the northern side of Saint Mark's Square. But by 6 March 1537, when the decision was made to locate the library within the new building, the plan was abandoned in favour of a single floor above the ground level. (Note: There are no surviving records regarding the debate, and it is not known what factors were determinative. See, Howard, Jacopo Sansovino..., pp. 15–16.) Scamozzi, nonetheless, recommended adding a floor to the library. Engineers were called to assess the existing foundation to determine whether it could bear the additional weight. The conclusions were equivocal, and it was ultimately decided in 1588 that the library would remain with only two floors. (Note: Manuela Morresi suggests that in addition to engineering considerations, the decision to retain the height of the library stemmed from the ascendency of the giovani faction in the aftermath of the constitutional crisis of 1582 and its opposition to the aggressive building programme. See Morresi, Jacopo Sansovino, p. 207.)

=== Architecture ===
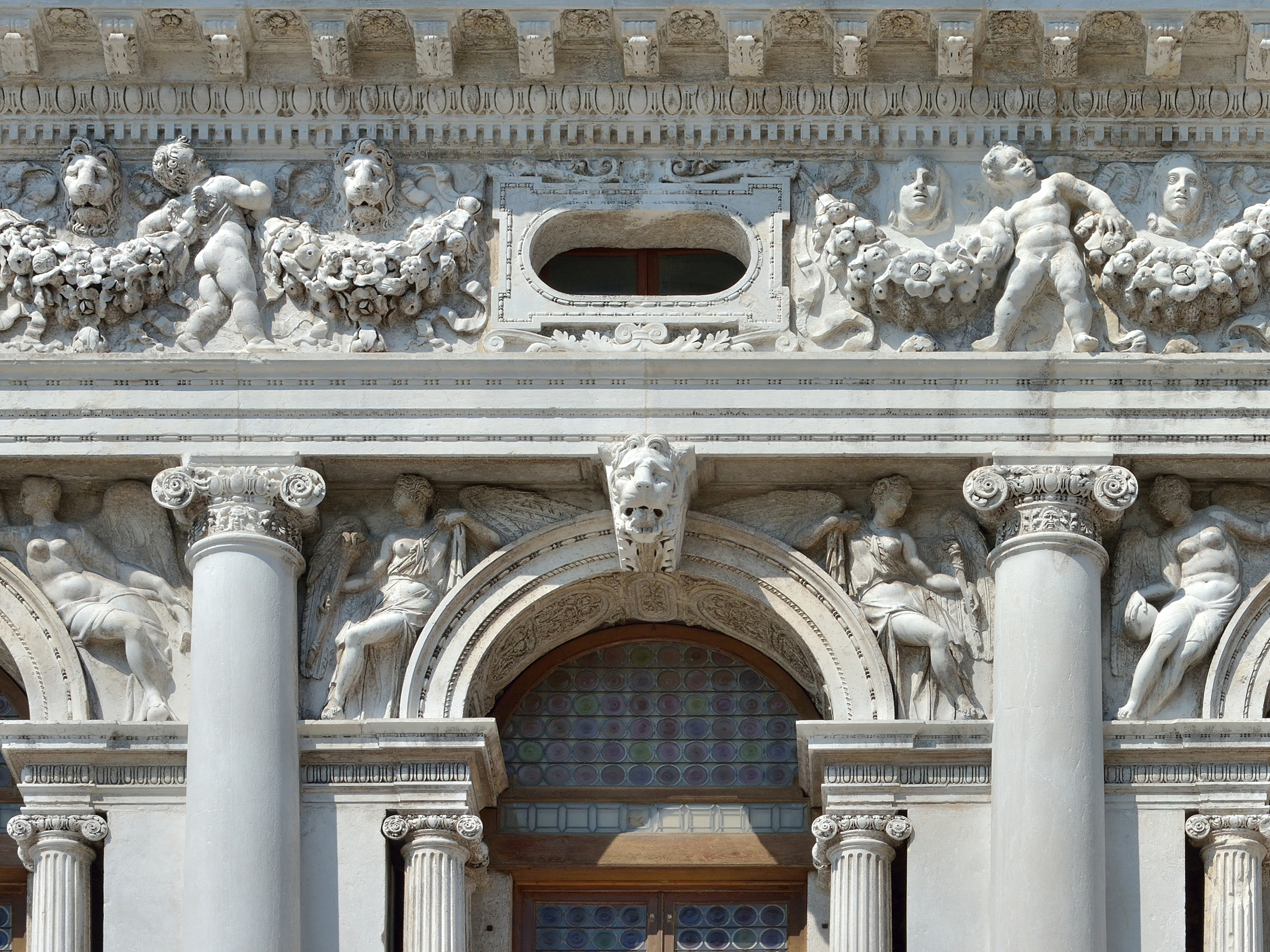
Detail of the façade, upper floor

==== Upper floor ====
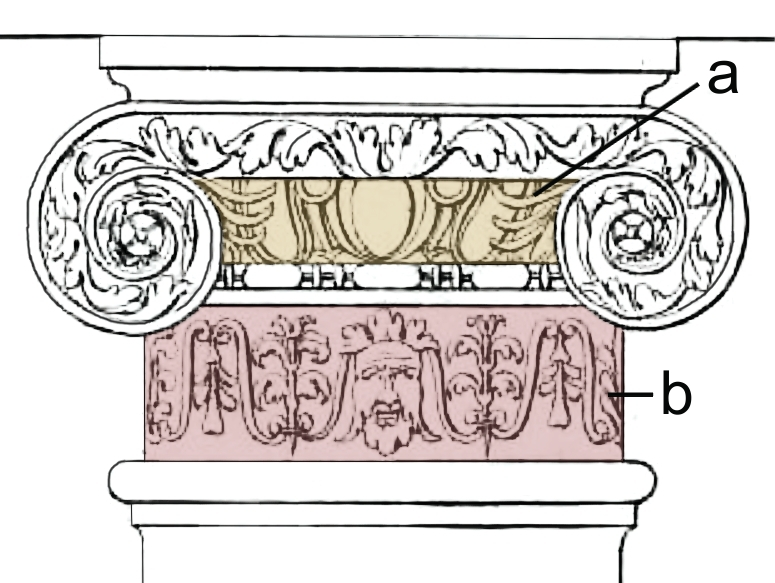
The Ionic capital of the Marciana Library with the decorative motifs in the echinus (a) and in the collar (b)

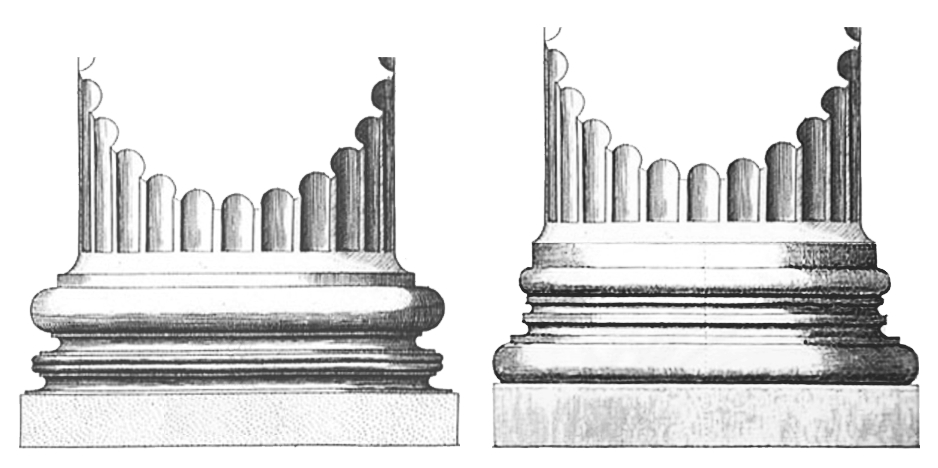
The Ionic base as described by Vitruvius (left) and as observed at Frascati and adopted by Sansovino for the Marciana Library (right)

The upper storey is characterized by a series of Serlians, so-called because the architectural element was illustrated and described by Sebastiano Serlio in his Tutte l'opere d'architettura et prospetiva, a seven-volume treatise for Renaissance architects and scholarly patrons. Later popularized by the architect Andrea Palladio, the element is also known as the Palladian window. It is inspired by ancient triumphal arches such as the Arch of Constantine and consists in a high-arched opening that is flanked by two shorter sidelights topped with lintels and supported by columns. From his days in Florence, Sansovino was likely familiar with the Serlian, having observed it in the tabernacle of the Merchants' guild by Donatello and Michelozzo (c. 1423) on the façade of the Church of Orsanmichele. He would have undoubtedly seen Donato Bramante's tripartite window in the Sala Regia of the Vatican during his Roman sojourn and may have been aware of the sixteenth-century nymphaeum at Genazzano near Rome, attributed to Bramante, where the Serlian is placed in a series. (Note: The Serlian is placed in a series by Giulio Romano for the riverfront façade of Villa Turini-Lante. See Morresi, Jacopo Sansovino, p. 193) At the Marciana, Sansovino adopted the contracted Serlian of the Orsanmichele prototype, which has narrow sidelights, but these are separated from the tall opening by double columns, placed one behind the other. This solution of the narrow sidelights ensured greater strength to the structural walls, which was necessary to balance the thrust of the barrel vault originally planned for the upper storey.

Layered over the series of Serlians is a row of large Ionic columns. The capitals with the egg-and-dart motif in the echinus and flame palmettes and masks in the collar may have been directly inspired by the Temple of Saturn in Rome and perhaps by the Villa Medicea at Poggio a Caiano by Giuliano da Sangallo. For the bases, as a sign of his architectural erudition, Sansovino adopted the Ionic base as it had been directly observed and noted by Antonio da Sangallo the Younger and Baldassare Peruzzi in ancient ruins at Frascati. (Note: This Ionic base, utilized once by Palladio for Palazzo Porto in Vicenza, is believed to have been part of the Villa of Lucullus at Frascati. See Maria Barbara Guerrieri Borsoi, Villa Rufina Falconieri: la rinascita di Frascati e la più antica dimora tuscolana (Roma: Gangemi, 2008), p. 13, ISBN 8849214065. For a discussion and comparison with the Attic and Vitruvian bases for the Ionic order, see Howard Burns, '"Ornamenti" and ornamentation in Palladio's architectural theory and practice', Pegasus: Berliner Beiträge zum Nachleben der Antike, 11 (2009), pp. 49–50, ISSN 1436-3461.) The idea of an ornate frieze above the columns with festoons alternating with window openings had already been used by Sansovino for the courtyard of Palazzo Gaddi in Rome (1519–1527). But the insertion of windows into a frieze had been pioneered even earlier by Bramante at Palazzo Caprini in Rome (1501–1510, demolished 1938) and employed in Peruzzi's early sixteenth-century Villa Farnesina. In the library, the specific pattern of the festoons with putti appears to be based on an early second-century sarcophagus fragment belonging to Cardinal Domenico Grimani's collection of antiquities. (Note: The fragment showing the rape of Proserpina is in the Museo Archeologico Nazionale di Venezia, inv. 167. See also Antonio Foscari, 'Festoni e putti nella decorazione della Libreria di San Marco', Arte veneta, XXXVIII (1984), pp. 23–30.)

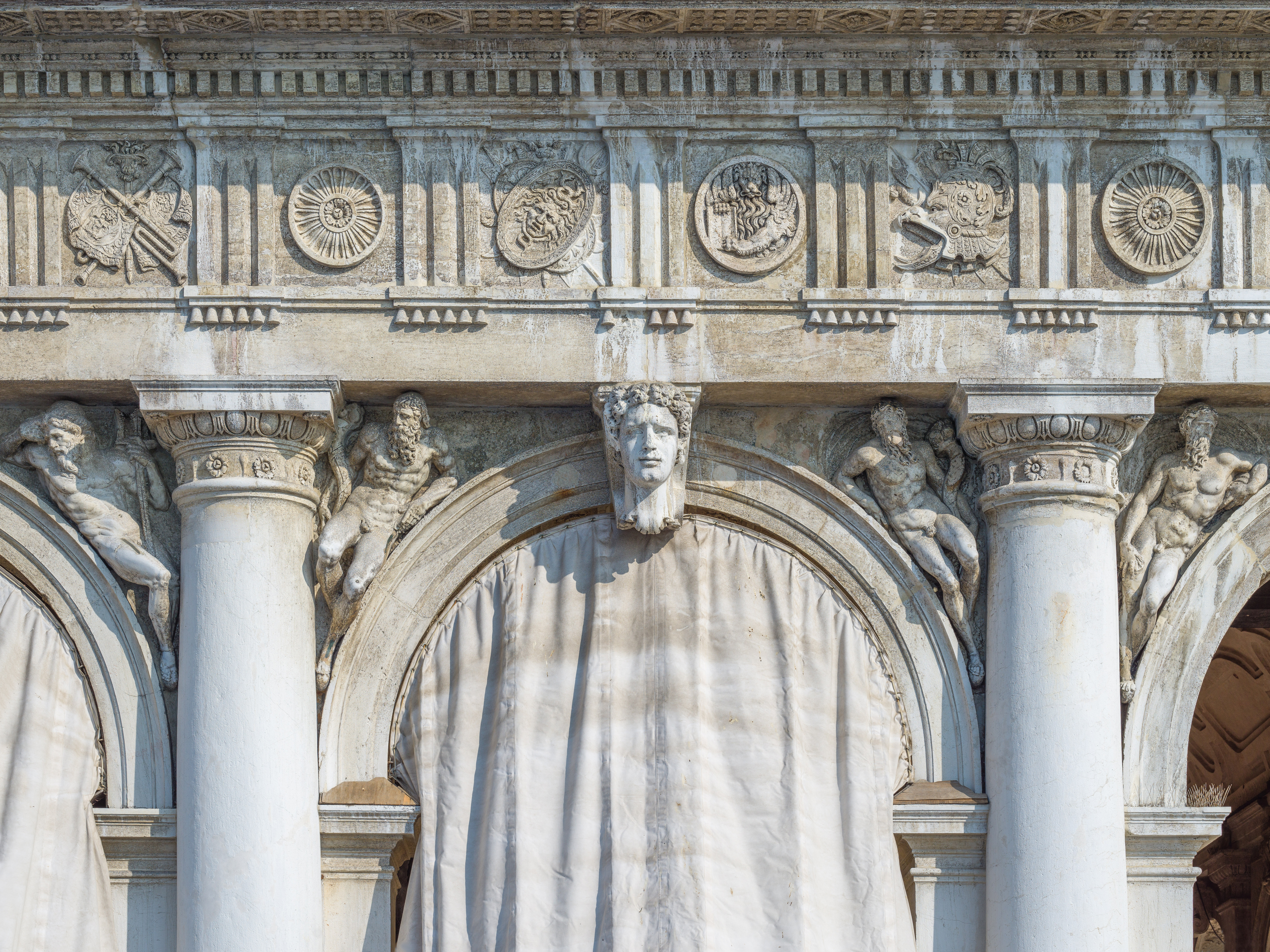
Detail of the façade, ground floor

==== Ground floor ====
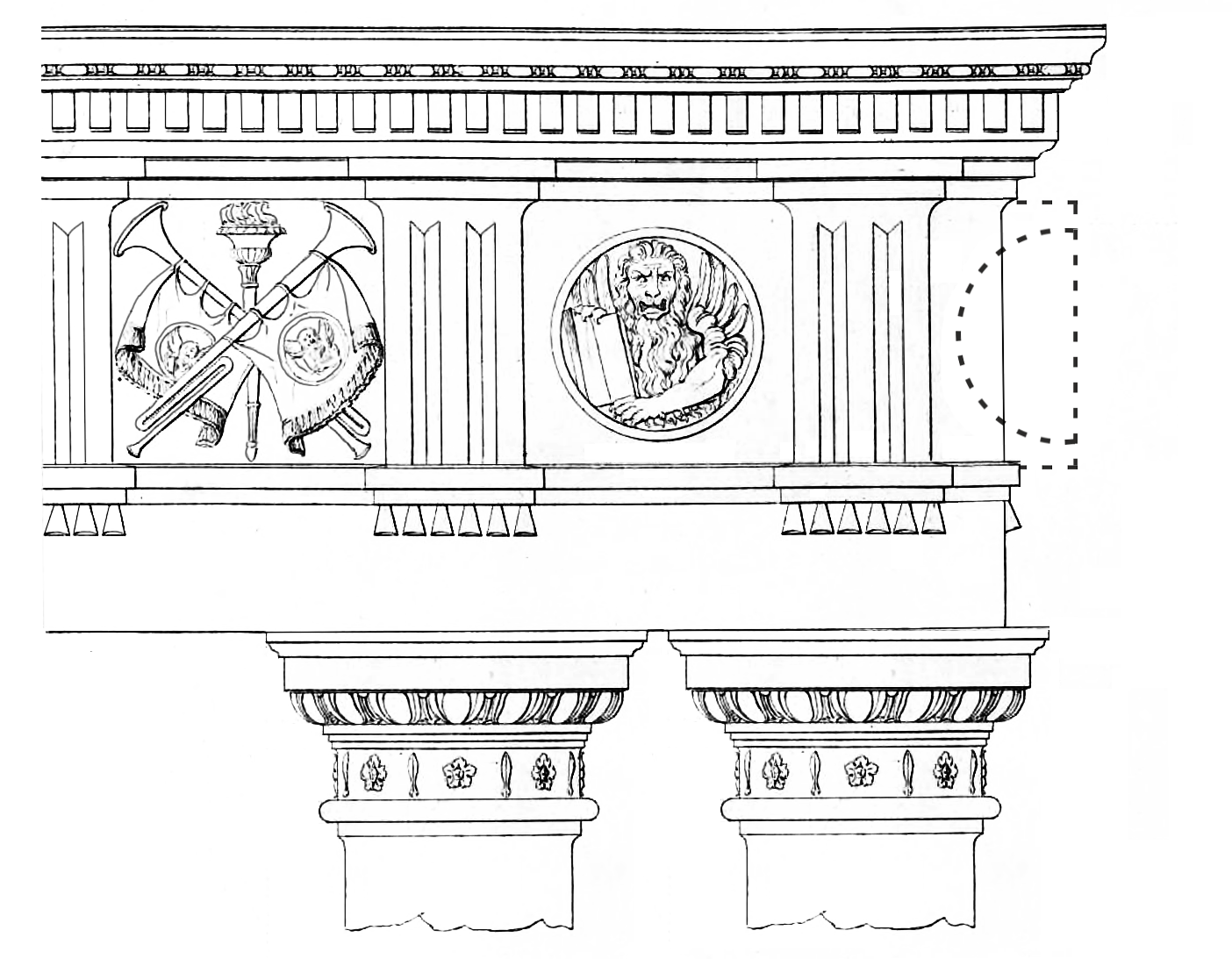
Theoretical corner of the Marciana Library with a final column, showing the insufficient space for a half metope

Sansovino's solution for the corner with a final pilaster placed on a wider pier (shaded)

The ground floor is modelled on the Theatre of Marcellus and the Colosseum in Rome. It consists in a succession of Doric columns supporting an entablature and is layered over a series of arches resting on pillars. The combination of columns layered over an arcade had been proposed by Bramante for the Palazzo di Giustizia (unexecuted), and was employed by Antonio da Sangallo the younger for the courtyard of Palazzo Farnese (begun 1517). (Note: The motif was earlier proposed by Antonio da Sangallo the Younger for Palazzo Farnese and may have been intended for the Church of San Giovanni dei Fiorentini in Rome. See, Lotz, 'The Roman Legacy in Sansovino's Venetian Buildings', pp. 8–9.) In adopting the solution for the Marciana Library, Sansovino was faithfully adhering to the recommendation of Leon Battista Alberti that in larger structures the column, inherited from Greek architecture, should only support an entablature, whereas the arch, inherited from Roman mural construction, should be supported on square pillars so that the resulting arcade appears to be the residual of "a wall open and discontinued in several places".

According to the architect's son, Francesco, Sansovino's design for the corner of the Doric frieze was much discussed and admired for its faithful adherence to the principles of Ancient Roman architecture as outlined by Vitruvius in De architectura. These principles required that a triglyph be centred over the last column and then followed by half a metope, but the space was insufficient. With no surviving classical examples to guide them, Bramante, Antonio da Sangallo the Younger, Raphael, and other great Renaissance architects had struggled with the dilemma, implementing various ideas, none of which satisfied the Vitruvian dictum. (Note: Bramante's solution for the choir of Saint Peter's consisted in placing a metope, and not a triglyph, over the lesenes. This solution, highly criticized by Guillaume Philandrier in his treatise In decem libros M. Vitruvii (Lyons: Jean de Tournes, 1552), was adopted by Antonio da Sangallo for Palazzo Baldassini and by Raphael for Palazzo Jacopo da Brescia. Giuliano da Sangallo's rendition of the Basilica Aemilia shows the triglyph off-centered with respect to the pilaster. The same architect proposed two solutions for the design of San Lorenzo in Florence: an angular triglyph or an axial triglyph followed by a reduced metope. See Morresi, Jacopo Sansovino, pp. 451–453 (note 139 for bibliographical references).) Sansovino's solution was to lengthen the end of the frieze by placing a final pilaster on a wider pier, thus creating the space necessary for a perfect half metope. (Note: Lotz suggests that the inspiration may have been the corner pier in Santa Maria presso San Biaggio in Montepulciano which lacks, however, the corner metope. See Lotz, 'The Roman Legacy in Sansovino's Venetian Buildings', p. 9.) Francesco Sansovino relates that his father additionally sensationalized the design by challenging the leading architects in Italy to resolve the problem and then triumphantly revealing his own solution.

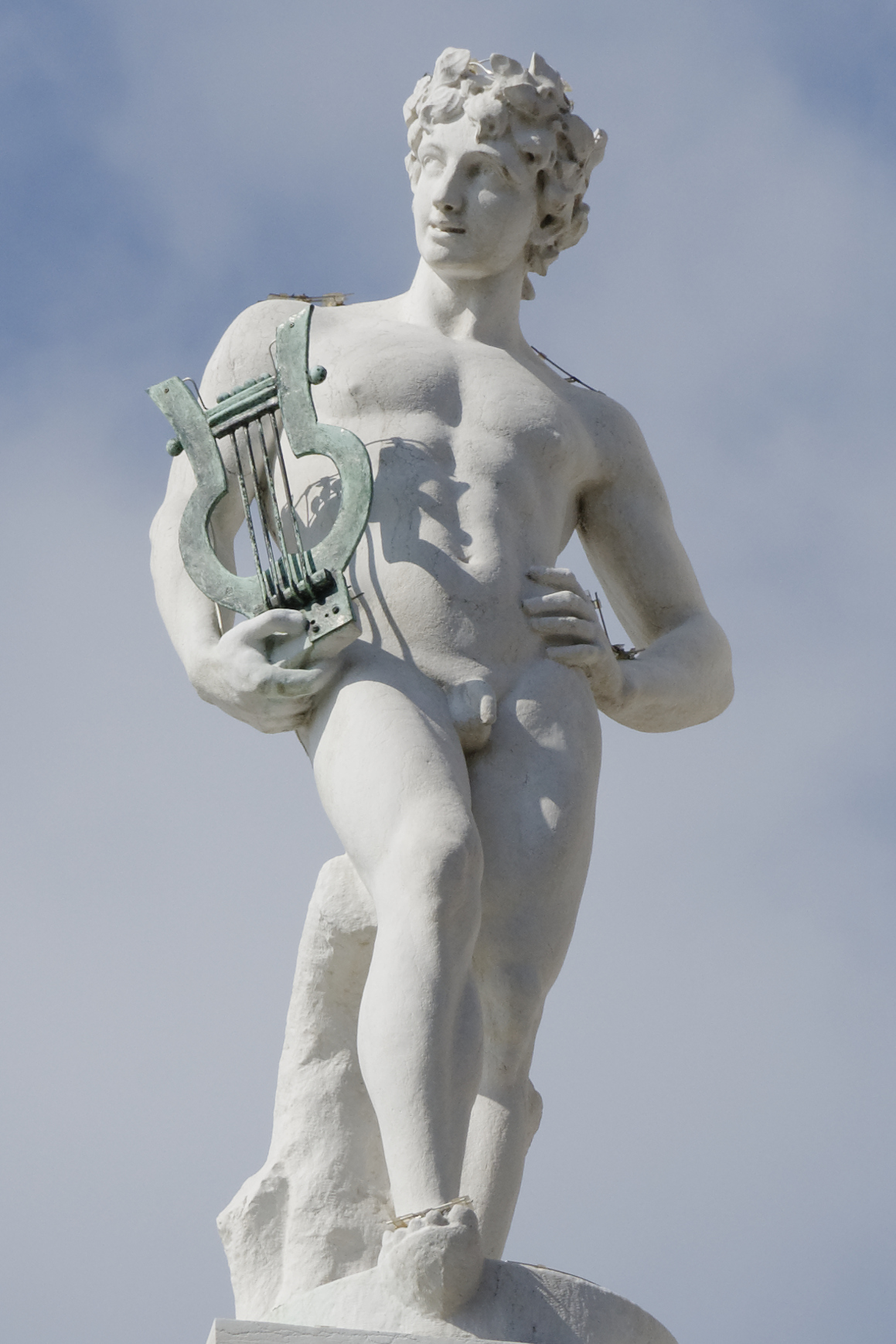
Girolamo Campagna (attributed), statue of Apollo (Orpheus?)

==== Carvings ====
Rather than a two-dimensional wall, the façade is conceived as an assemblage of three-dimensional structural elements, including piers, arcades, columns, and entablatures layered atop one another to create a sense of depth, which is increased by the extensive surface carvings. These are the work of Sansovino's collaborators, including Danese Cattaneo, Pietro da Salò, Bartolomeo Ammannati, and Alessandro Vittoria. Male figures in high relief are located in the spandrels on the ground floor. With the exception of the arch in correspondence to the entry of the library which has Neptune holding a trident and Aeolus with a wind-filled sail, these figures represent allegories of non-specific rivers, characterized by the cornucopias and the urns with water flowing out. The enlarged keystones of the arches on the ground floor alternate between lions’ heads and the heads of pagan divinities (Ceres?, Pan, Apollo, Diana, Mercury, Minerva, Venus, Mars, Juno?, Jupiter, Saturn, and Phanes). In low relief, the underarches have either mythological scenes, mostly related to the divinity in the keystone, or grotesques. The spandrels on the upper floor have allegorical female figures with wings. These are in mid relief, thus creating the illusion that they are further from the viewer. The upright structural axes, consisting of the succession of columns and pedestals, become progressively lighter. This all serves to emphasize the verticality and counterbalance the long, horizontal succession of arcades.

The balustrade above is surmounted by statues of pagan divinities and immortalized heroes of Antiquity. Built by Scamozzi between 1588 and 1591 following Sansovino's design, this solution for the roofline may have been influenced by Michelangelo's designs for the Capitoline Hill in Rome and may have later inspired Scamozzi's own work at the Teatro Olimpico in Vicenza. (Note: Deborah Howard suggests that the idea for the balustrade may have been derived from Raphael's design for Palazzo Branconio dell'Aquila. See Howard, Jacopo Sansovino..., p. 27.) Among the sculptors were Agostino and Vigilio Rubini, Camillo Mariani, Tiziano Aspetti, and Girolamo Campagna. Over time, however, several of the original statues were eroded or otherwise damaged and ultimately replaced with statues that are not always consistent with the original subjects.

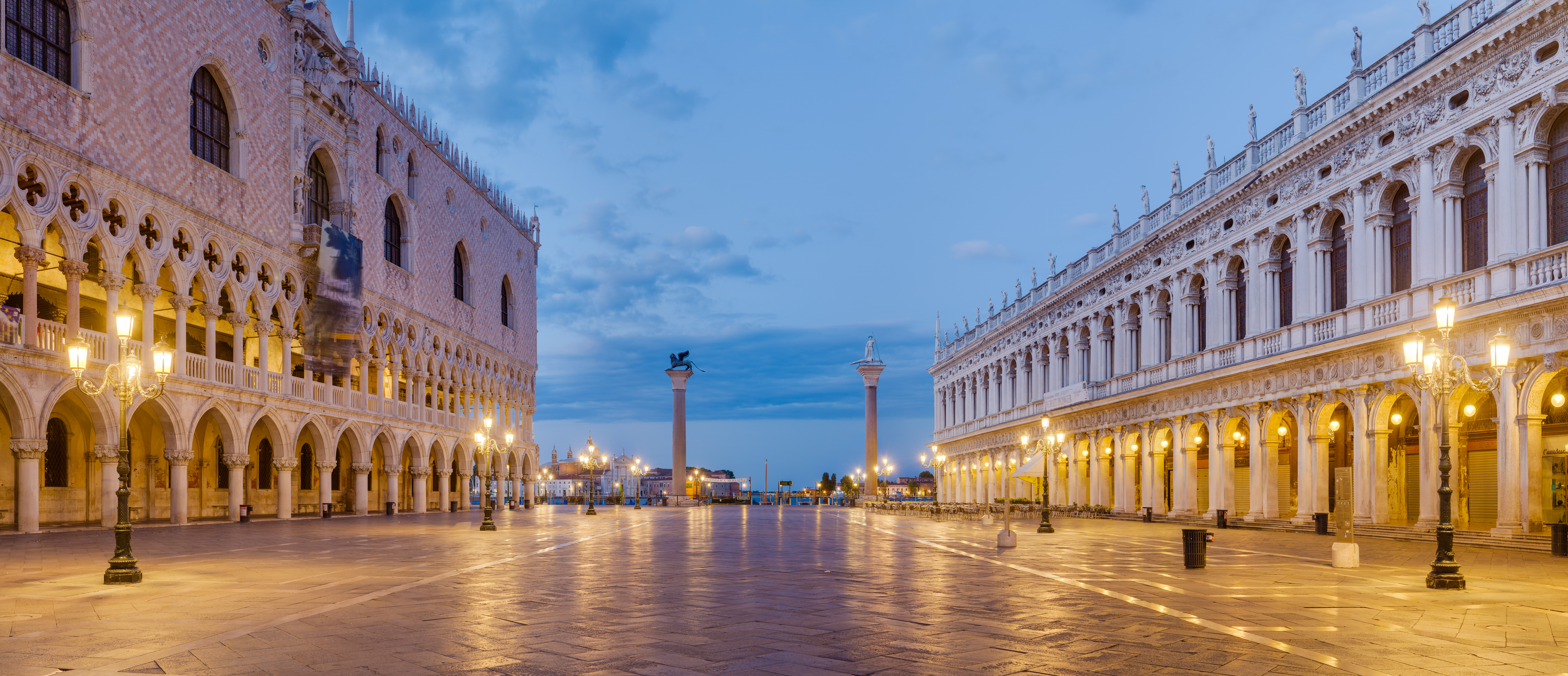
The Doge's Palace (left) and the Marciana Library (right)

The effect of the library, overall, is that the entire façade has been encrusted with archaeological artefacts. Statues and carvings abound, and there are no large areas of plain wall. In addition to the abundance of classical decorative elements – obelisks, keystone heads, spandrel figures, and reliefs – the Doric and Ionic orders, each with the appropriate frieze, cornice, and base, follow ancient Roman prototypes, giving the building a sense of authenticity. The proportions, however, do not always respect Vitruvian canons. Scamozzi, a rigid classicist, was critical of the arches on the ground floor, considered to be dwarfed and ill-proportioned, and the excessive height of the Ionic entablature with respect to the columns. (Note: Scamozzi considered appropriate a ratio between the height of the entablature and the column of 1 to 4 for the Doric order and 1 to 5 of the Ionic order, whereas the ratios in the library are 1 to 3 and 1 to 2 respectively. See Vincenzo Scamozzi, L’Idea dell’Architettura Universale (Venetiis: expensis auctoris, 1615), Lib. VI, Cap. VII, pp. 20–21.) Nevertheless, the classical references were sufficient to satisfy the Venetians’ desire to emulate the great civilizations of Antiquity and to present their own city as the successor of the Roman Republic. At the same time, the design respects many local building traditions and harmonizes with the gothic Doge's Palace through the common use of Istrian limestone, the two-storey arcades, the balustrades, and the elaborate rooflines.

=== Interior ===
The library historically occupied the upper floor, while the ground floor was let to shops, and later cafes, as sources of revenue to the procurators. The gilded interior rooms are decorated with oil paintings by the masters of Venice's Mannerist period, including Titian, Tintoretto, Paolo Veronese, and Andrea Schiavone. Some of these paintings show mythological scenes derived from the writings of classical authors: Ovid's Metamorphoses and Fasti, Apuleius's The Golden Ass, Nonnus's Dionysiaca, Martianus Capella's The Marriage of Philology and Mercury, and the Suda. In many instances, these stories of the pagan divinities are employed in a metaphorical sense on the basis of the early Christian writings of Arnobius and Eusebius. Other paintings show allegorical figures and include Renaissance hieroglyphics, consisting in symbols of plants, animals, and objects with specific, but enigmatic, meanings. They reflect the particular interest in the esotericism of the Hermetic writings and the Chaldean Oracles that enthused many humanists following the publication in 1505 of Horapollo's Ἱερογλυφικά (Hieroglyphica), the book discovered in 1419 by Cristoforo Buondelmonti and believed to be the key for deciphering ancient Egyptian hieroglyphics.

The iconographic sources vary and include Pierio Valeriano's dictionary of symbols, Hieroglyphica (1556); popular emblem books such as Andrea Alciati's Emblematum Liber (1531) and Achille Bocchi's Symbolicarum quaestionum de universo genere (1555); the divination game Le ingeniose sorti (1540) by Francesco Marcolini da Forlì; as well as Vincenzo Cartari's mythographic manual for painters Imagini colla sposizione degli dei degli antichi (1556). The "Mantegna Tarocchi" were used as iconographic sources for the depictions of the liberal arts and the muses in the staircase.

Although several images have a specific pedagogical function aimed at forming temperate and stalwart rulers and inculcating qualities of dedication to duty and moral excellence in the noble youth who studied in the library, the overall decorative programme reflects the Venetian aristocracy's interest in philosophy as an intellectual pursuit and, in a broader sense, the growing interest in Platonic philosophy as one of the central currents in Renaissance thought. It is conceptually organized on the basis of the Neoplatonic ascent of the soul and affirms that the quest for knowledge is directed towards the attainment of divine wisdom. The staircase largely represents the life of the embodied soul in the early stages of the ascent: the practice of the cardinal virtues, the study and contemplation of the sensible world in both its multiplicity and harmony, the transcendence of mere opinions (doxa) through dialectic, and catharsis. The reading room corresponds to the soul's subsequent journey within the intellectual realm and shows the culmination of the ascent with the awakening of the higher, intellective soul, ecstatic union, and illumination. The programme culminates with the representation of the ideal Platonic State founded upon a transcendent understanding of a higher reality. By association, it is implied that the Republic of Venice is the very paradigm of wisdom, order, and harmony.

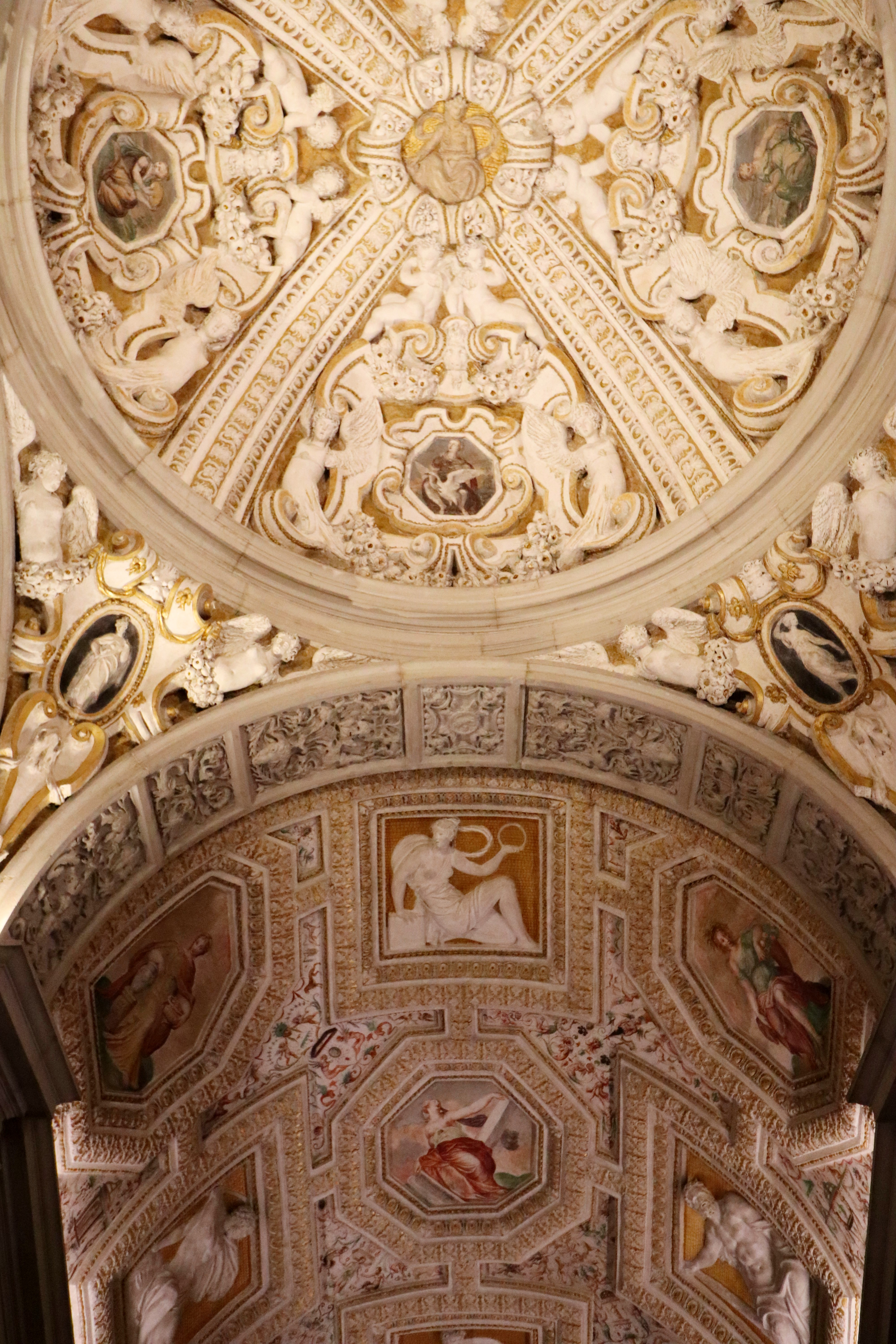
Staircase with the Dome of Poetics and the second flight (stuccoes by Alessandro Vittoria)

==== Staircase ====
The staircase consists of four domes (the Dome of Ethics, the Dome of Rhetoric, the Dome of Dialectic, and the Dome of Poetics) and two flights, the vaults of which are each decorated with twenty-one images of alternating quadrilinear stuccoes by Alessandro Vittoria and octagonal frescoes by Battista Franco (first flight) and Battista del Moro (second flight). At the entry and on the landings, Sansovino repeated the Serlian element from the façade, making use of ancient columns taken from the dilapidated sixth-century Byzantine Church of Santa Maria del Canneto in Pola on the Istrian peninsula.

==== Vestibule ====
The vestibule was conceived as a lecture hall for the public school of Saint Mark. Founded in 1446 to train civil servants for the Ducal Chancery, the school initially focused on grammar and rhetoric. With the addition of a second lectureship for poetry, oratory, and history in 1460, it evolved into a humanistic school, principally for the sons of the nobles and citizens. Among the Italian humanists who taught there were George of Trebizond, Giorgio Valla, Marcantonio Sabellico, Raphael Regius, Battista Egnazio, and Marco Musuro. The vestibule additionally hosted the meetings of the Accademia Veneziana from 1560 until the academy's dissolution for bankruptcy the following year.

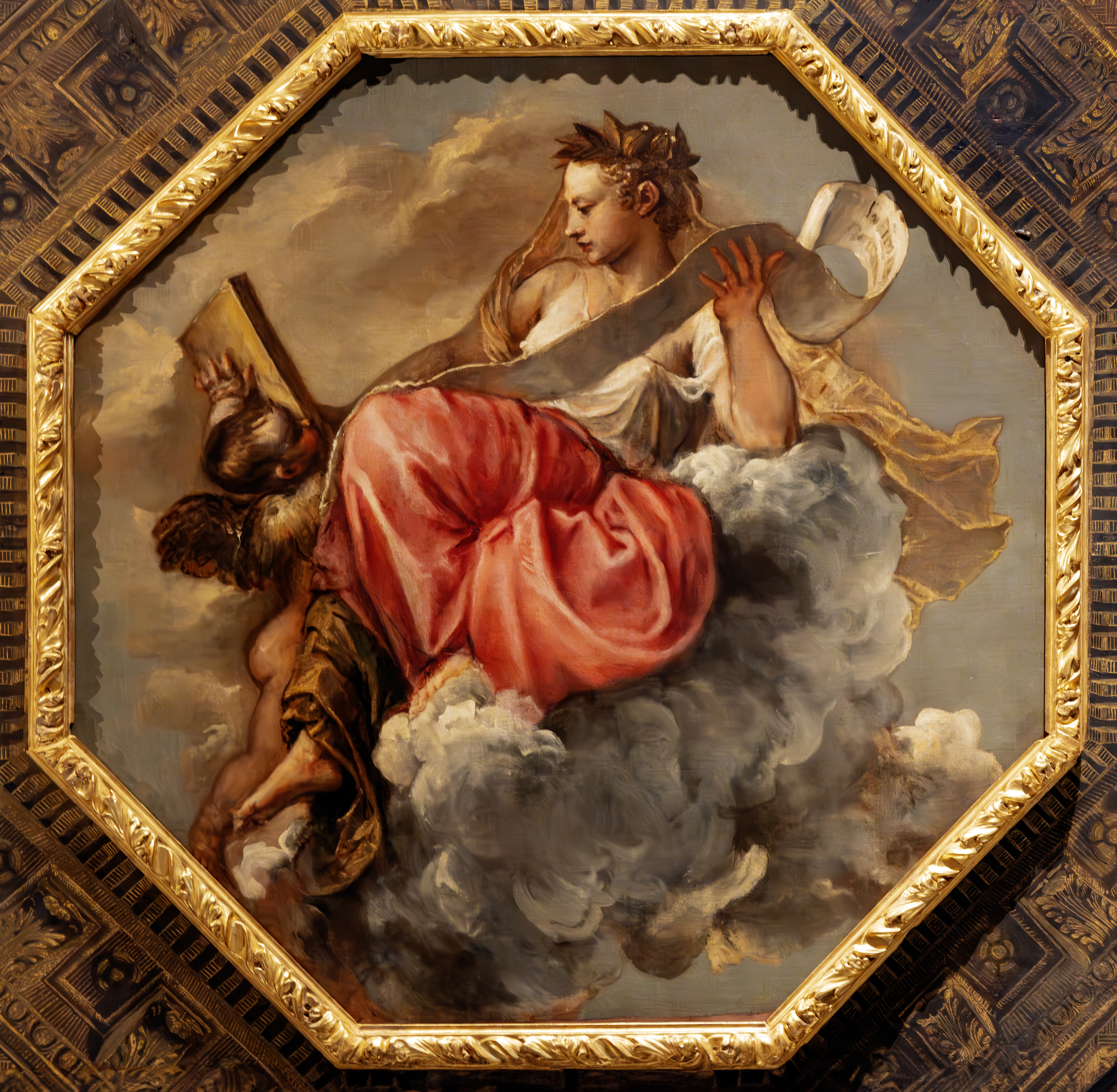
Titian, "Wisdom" (c. 1560)

The room was originally lined with wooden benches, interrupted by a lectern that was located under the central window of the western wall. Beginning in 1591, it was transformed into the public Statuary Hall by Vincenzo Scamozzi in order to display the collection of ancient sculpture that Giovanni Grimani had donated to the Venetian Republic in 1587. Of the original decoration, only the ceiling remains with the illusionistic three-dimensional decoration by Cristoforo and Stefano De Rosa of Brescia (1559). Titian's octagonal painting in the centre has most often been identified as a personification of Wisdom or History. Other suggestions include Poetry, Philosophy, Rhetoric, and Love of Letters.

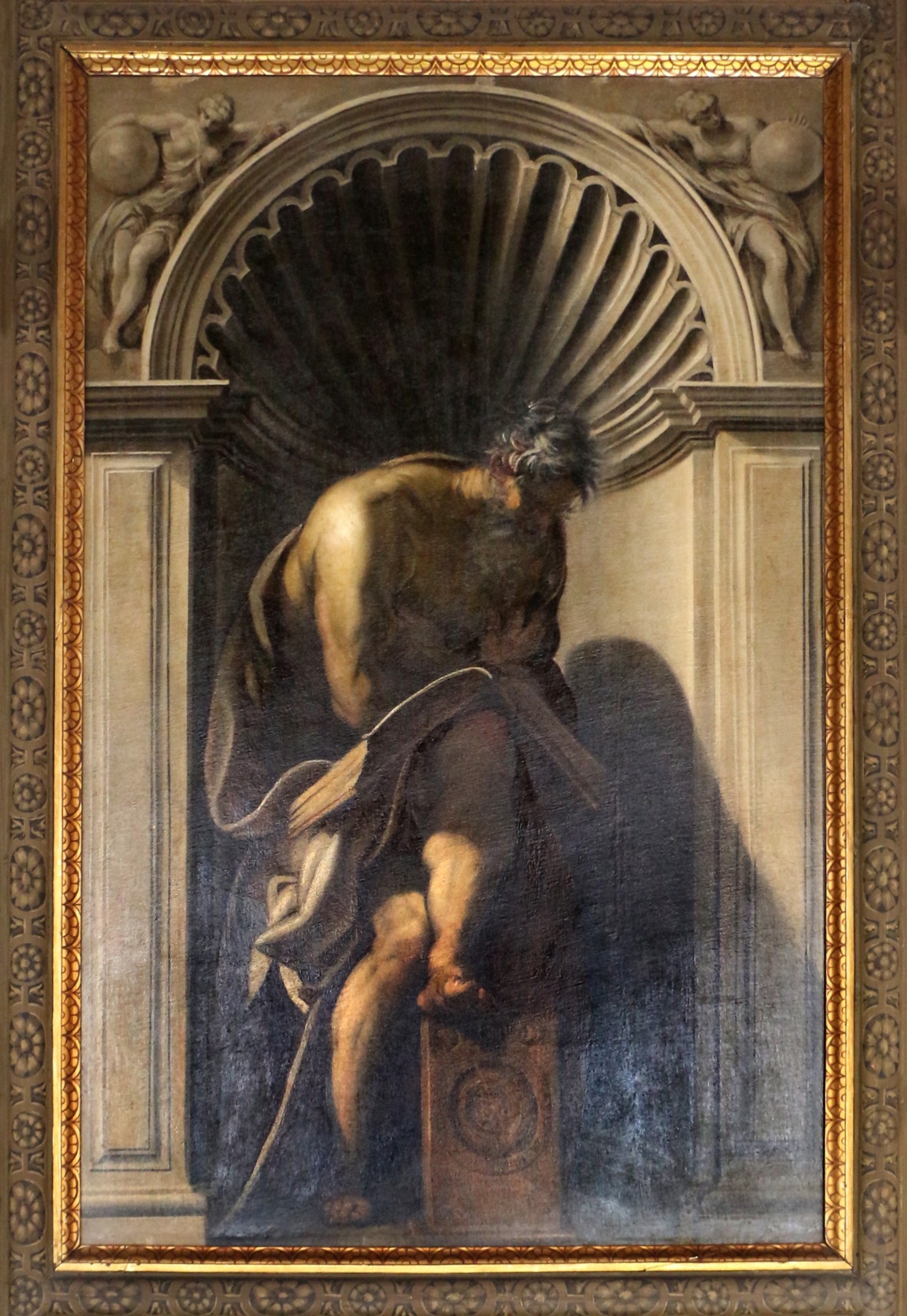
Tintoretto, Diogenes

==== Reading Room ====
The adjacent reading room originally had 38 desks in the centre, arranged in two rows, to which the valuable codices were chained according to subject matter. (Note: The Latin section, slightly smaller, occupied desks 1 to 16 and included rhetoric, secular history, medicine, canon and civil law, logic, moral philosophy, the works of Aristotle and his commentators, natural sciences, mathematics, astronomy, Peter Lombard's The Four Books of Sentences and relative commentaries, theology, the works of Thomas Aquinas and Augustine, and Biblical texts with commentaries. The Greek section originally occupied desks 17 to 38 and included grammar, poetry, secular history, rhetoric, medicine, civil law, the works of Aristotle and his commentators, the writings of Plato and the Platonists, mathematics and astronomy, hagiography, theology, canon law, and Biblical texts with commentaries. See Zorzi, La libreria di san Marco..., pp. 159–161 and Labowsky, Bessarion's Library..., pp. 95–96.) Between the windows were imaginary portraits of great men of Antiquity, the 'philosophers', each originally accompanied by an identifying inscription. Similar portraits were located in the vestibule. Over time, however, these paintings were moved to various locations within the library and eventually, in 1763, to the Doge's Palace in order to create the wall space necessary for more bookshelves. As a result, some were lost along with all of the identifying inscriptions. The ten that survive were returned to the library in the early nineteenth century and integrated with other paintings in 1929. Of the 'philosophers', only Diogenes by Tintoretto has been credibly identified. (Note: In 1967, Nicola Ivanoff identified Aristotle and Plato in the 'philosophers' by Veronese and, tentatively, Ptolemy and Democritus in the 'philosophers' by Andrea Schiavone (one of which is alternatively attributed to Giuseppe Salviati). However, these identifications are purely speculative and without significant supporting arguments. Ivanoff identifies Aristotle solely on the basis of the oriental headdress, which is said to be a reference to his Arab translators. He also sees a possible correlation in the hand gesture between Veronese's 'philosopher' and the figure of Aristotle in Raphael's School of Athens. For Plato, he references Marsilio Ficino's imaginary description of the philosopher as being older and bearded with broad shoulders, a high brow, and an inspired look and then writes that most of these features are present in Veronese's 'philosopher'. See Ivanoff, 'La libreria Marciana'..., pp. 43.)

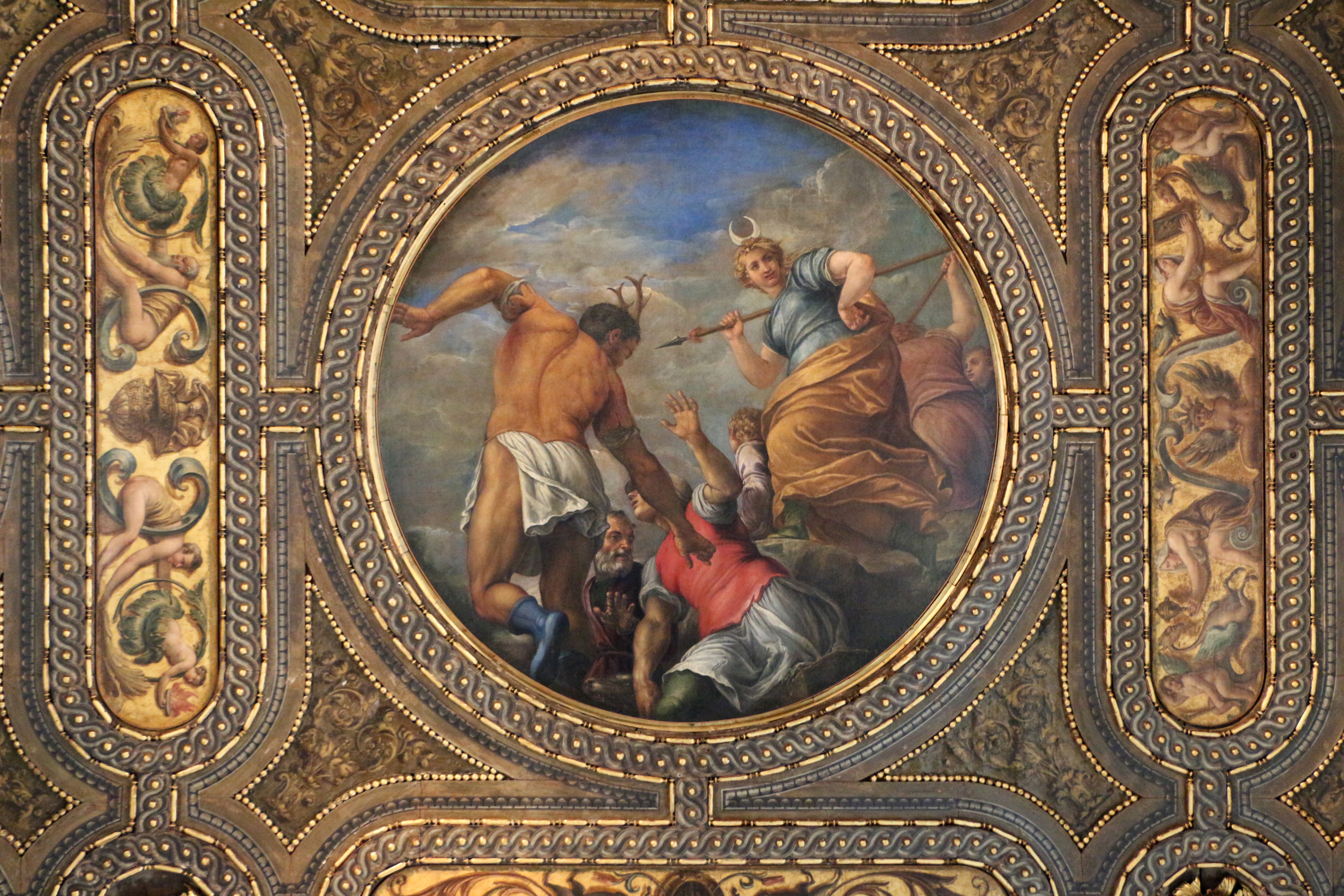
Battista Franco, Actaeon and Diana and grotesques

The ceiling of the reading room is decorated with 21 roundels, circular oil paintings, by Giovanni de Mio, Giuseppe Salviati, Battista Franco, Giulio Licinio, Bernardo Strozzi, Giambattista Zelotti, Alessandro Varotari, Paolo Veronese, and Andrea Schiavone. They are inserted into a gilded and painted wooden framework along with 52 grotesques by Battista Franco. The roundels by Bernardo Strozzi and Alessandro Varotari are replacements from 1635 of earlier roundels, respectively by Giulio Licinio and Giambattista Zelotti, which were irreparably damaged by water infiltrations. The original roundels were commissioned in 1556. (Note: The contracts stipulated with Giuseppe Salviati, Battista Franco, and Giulio Licinio survive and specify a payment of 20 ducats per painting. Although the canvas would be provided by the procurators, the artists themselves were to provide their own pigments with the exception of blue ultramarine which would be paid for separately. The contract relative to Salviati is published in Pittoni, La libreria di san Marco, pp. 111–112.)

Although the original seven artists were formally chosen by Sansovino and Titian, their selection for an official and prestigious commission such as the library was indicative of the ascendancy of the Grimani and of those other families within the aristocracy who maintained close ties with the papal court and whose artistic preferences consequently tended towards Mannerism as it was developing in Tuscany, Emilia, and Rome. The artists were mostly young and innovative. They were primarily foreign-trained and substantially outside the Venetian tradition in their artistic styles, having been influenced by the trends in Florence, Rome, Mantua, and Parma, particularly by the work of Michelangelo, Giulio Romano, and Parmigianino. To varying degrees, the roundels that they produced for the ceiling of the reading room are consequently characterized by the emphasis on line drawing, the greater sculptural rigidity and artificial poses of the figures, and the overall dramatic compositions. They nevertheless show the influence of the Venetian painting tradition in both the colouring and brushwork.

For the single roundels, various and conflicting titles have been proposed over time. (Note: For the principal studies and proposed titles, see Giorgio Vasari, Le vite de' piu eccellenti pittori scultori e architettori, vol. III, parte 2 (Fiorenza: I Giunti, 1568), p. 526; Francesco Sansovino, Venetia città nobilissima et singolare descritta in 14 libri (Venetia: Iacomo Sansovino, 1581), fols 114r–114v; Carlo Ridolfi, Le maraviglie dell'arte, overo Le vite de gl'illustri pittori veneti, e dello Stato (Venetia: Gio. Battista Sgava, 1648), pp. parte I, 222, 230–231, 291–292, 352; Marco Boschini, Le minere della pittura (Venezia: Francesco Nicolini, 1664), pp. 90–91; Francesco Macedo, Pictura Venetae vrbis, eiusque partium in tabulis Latinis, coloribus oratorijs expressa, & pigmentis poeticis colorata (Venetiis: Cieras, 1670), pp. 56–59; Domenico Martinelli, Il ritratto di Venezia (Venezia: Gio. Giacomo Hertz, 1684), pp. 589–590 [sic]; Antonio Maria Zanetti, Della pittura veneziana e delle opere pubbliche de' veneziani maestri (Venezia: Giambatista Albrizzi, 1771), pp. 182, 244, 248–250, 284, 369, 497–498, 509; Giulio Lorenzetti, Venezia e il suo estuario: guida storico-artistica (Venezia: Bestetti & Tuminelli, 1926), p. 161; Nicola Ivanoff, 'La libreria Marciana: arte e iconologia', Saggi e Memorie, 6 (1967), pp. 33–78; Antonio Paolucci, 'La sala della libreria e il ciclo pittorico' in Rodolfo Pallucchini ed., Da Tiziano a El Greco. Per la storia del Manierismo a Venezia 1540–1590 (Milano: Electa, 1981), pp. 287–298; Charles Hope, 'The Ceiling Paintings in the Libreria Marciana' in Massimo Gemin, ed., Nuovi Studi su Paolo Veronese (Venezia: Arsenale Editrice, 1990), pp. 290–298; Jarrod, M. Broderick, 'Custodian of Wisdom: The Marciana Reading Room and the Transcendent Knowledge of God', Studi veneziani, LXXIII (2016), pp. 15–94.) The earliest titles that Giorgio Vasari suggested for the three roundels by Veronese contain conspicuous errors, and even the titles and visual descriptions given by Francesco Sansovino, son of the architect, for all 21 roundels are often imprecise or inaccurate.

CEILING OF THE READING ROOM

with Francesco Sansovino's titles/descriptions and the more recent proposals

KEY: (S) = Sansovino, 1581 (I) = Ivanoff, 1967 (P) = Paolucci, 1981 (H) = Hope, 1990 (B) = Broderick, 2016

1 – Giovanni de Mio (S) Nature before Jupiter, asking permission to bring forth all things, and Pallas advises Jupiter on the sequence (P) Nature between Pallas and Jupiter (H) Jupiter, Minerva, and Nature (B) The Logos	2 – Giovanni de Mio (S) Theology before the gods, to whom Ganymede presents ambrosia & nectar, demonstrating what Theology does for Faith, Hope, and Charity (I) Theology (P) Theological Virtues before the Divinity (H) Theology and the Theological Virtues before Jupiter (B) The One	3 – Giovanni de Mio (S) Natural Philosophy, in the middle of the world, with the Elements, with herbs, with animals, and with humans around (P) Nature and the Seasons (H) Nature and the Seasons (B) Nature and the Seasons
4 – Giuseppe Salviati (S) Virtue, spurning Fortune, turns to Prudence, to Justice, to Fortitude, to Temperance, and to other companions (I) Virtue, spurning Fortune, turns to Prudence, to Justice, to Fortitude, to Temperance, and to other companions (P) Pallas between Fortune and Virtue (H) Wisdom prefers Virtue to Fortune (B) Minerva between Fortune and the Virtues	5 – Giuseppe Salviati (S) Art with the physiognomy that shows ingenuity, acuity, & alacrity, with Mercury nearby and Pluto (I) Eloquence (P) Mercury and Pluto and the arts (H) Art, Mercury, and Pluto (B) The Marriage of Philology and Mercury	6 – Giuseppe Salviati (S) Militia (I) Militia (P) Pallas and Hercules (H) Militia and Masculine Virtue (B) Minerva and Hercules
7 – Battista Franco (S) Agriculture with Pomona, Ceres, and Vertumnus (I) Agriculture (P) Vertumnus, Ceres and Pomona (H) Agriculture with Pomona, Ceres, and Vertumnus (B) Attis and Cybele with Nana and Sangaritis	8 – Battista Franco (S) Hunting where are Diana & Actaeon, with dogs, nets, & other things necessary for that art (I) Hunting (P) Diana and Actaeon (H) The Choice between Study and Worldly Pleasure (B) Actaeon and Diana	9 – Battista Franco (S) Celerity, Toil, and Practice & other things (I) Physical Exercise (P) Celerity between Toil and Exercise (H) Industry and Exercise (B) Prudent Reflection and Mutual Aid
10 – Giulio Licinio (S) Vigil, fasting, patience & other things that followers of virtue seek (I) Allegory of Time (P) Allegory of Vigil and Sacrifice (H) Vigil and Sacrifice (B) Vigil and Exercise	11 – Giulio Licinio (S) Glory, beatitude, & other ecstasies that are acquired by means of hard work aimed at obtaining virtue (I) Beatitude & other ecstasies that are acquired by means of hard work aimed at obtaining virtue (P) Glory and Beatitude (H) Glory and Beatitude (B) Ecstasy	12 – Bernardo Strozzi (S) The delight that comes from various disciplines, aptitude, and the good habits of study and virtue (note: the description refers to the original roundel by Giulio Licinio) (I) Sculpture (P) Allegory of Sculpture (B) Measure of Self
13 – Giambattista Zelotti (S) Various elements that are necessary to learning (P) Allegory of Study that casts out Distraction (H) The Choice between Study and Sensual Indulgence (B) Diligence opposite Lust	14 – Giambattista Zelotti (S) The delight that comes from various disciplines, aptitude, and the good habits of study and virtue (I) Measure (P) Allegory of Modesty (H) Virtue and Knowledge? (B) The Soul before Divine Wisdom Enthroned	15 – Alessandro Varotari (S) Mathematics with their instruments (note: the title refers to the original roundel by Giambattista Zelotti) (P) Atlas (B) Atlas Shouldering the World
16 – Paolo Veronese (S) Honour, in the ancient manner, with people around who offer incense and make sacrifice (I) Honour with people around who offer incense and make sacrifice (P) Honour (H) Honour (B) Genius of the Venetian People	17 – Paolo Veronese (S) Geometry & Arithmetic with their symbols (I) Geometry and Arithmetic (P) Arithmetic and Geometry (H) Astronomy, Music, and Deceit (B) Mathematical Sciences and Intellection	18 – Paolo Veronese (S) Music with various instruments and bizarre inventions (I) Music (P) Music (H) Music (B) Harmony and Beauty
19 – Andrea Schiavone (S) Priesthood (I) Priesthood (P) Priesthood (B) The People	20 – Andrea Schiavone (S) The Dignity of Empires and Kingdoms (I) The Dignity of Empires and Kingdoms (P) The Dignity of Empires and Kingdoms (B) The Philosopher-Kings	21 – Andrea Schiavone (S) The Triumph of Captains (I) The Triumph of Captains (P) The Triumph of Captains (B) The Warriors
Note: The roundels by Andrea Schiavone are shown in their original positions. The inversion of roundels 19 and 20 occurred between 1819 and 1839, probably following structural work or restoration.

== Later history ==
=== Venetian administration ===
Although the procurators retained responsibility for the library building, in 1544 the Council of Ten assigned the custodianship of the collection to the riformatori dello studio di Padova, the educational committee of the Senate. Created in 1517, the riformatori had initially been tasked with reopening the University of Padua after its closure during the years of the War of Cambrai. (Note: Originating as a temporary committee, the riformatori were definitively established in 1528. See Andrea Da Mosto, L'Archivio di Stato di Venezia: indice generale, storico, descrittivo ed analitico, vol. I, (Roma: Biblioteca d'arte, 1937), p. 217) This involved repairing physical damage to the buildings, hiring new professors, and organizing courses. Over time, their role came to encompass virtually all aspects of public education. Under the riformatori, the collection was first catalogued (1545). Preparations were made to move the manuscripts and books from the upper floor of Saint Mark's to the new building: the effective date of the transfer is not known from any surviving documents, but it must have occurred between 1559 and 1565, probably prior to July 1560. For the loaning of the valuable codices, the Council of Ten established stricter conditions which included the requirement of a deposit in gold or silver in the amount of 25 ducats. The sum, already substantial, was increased to 50 ducats in 1558.

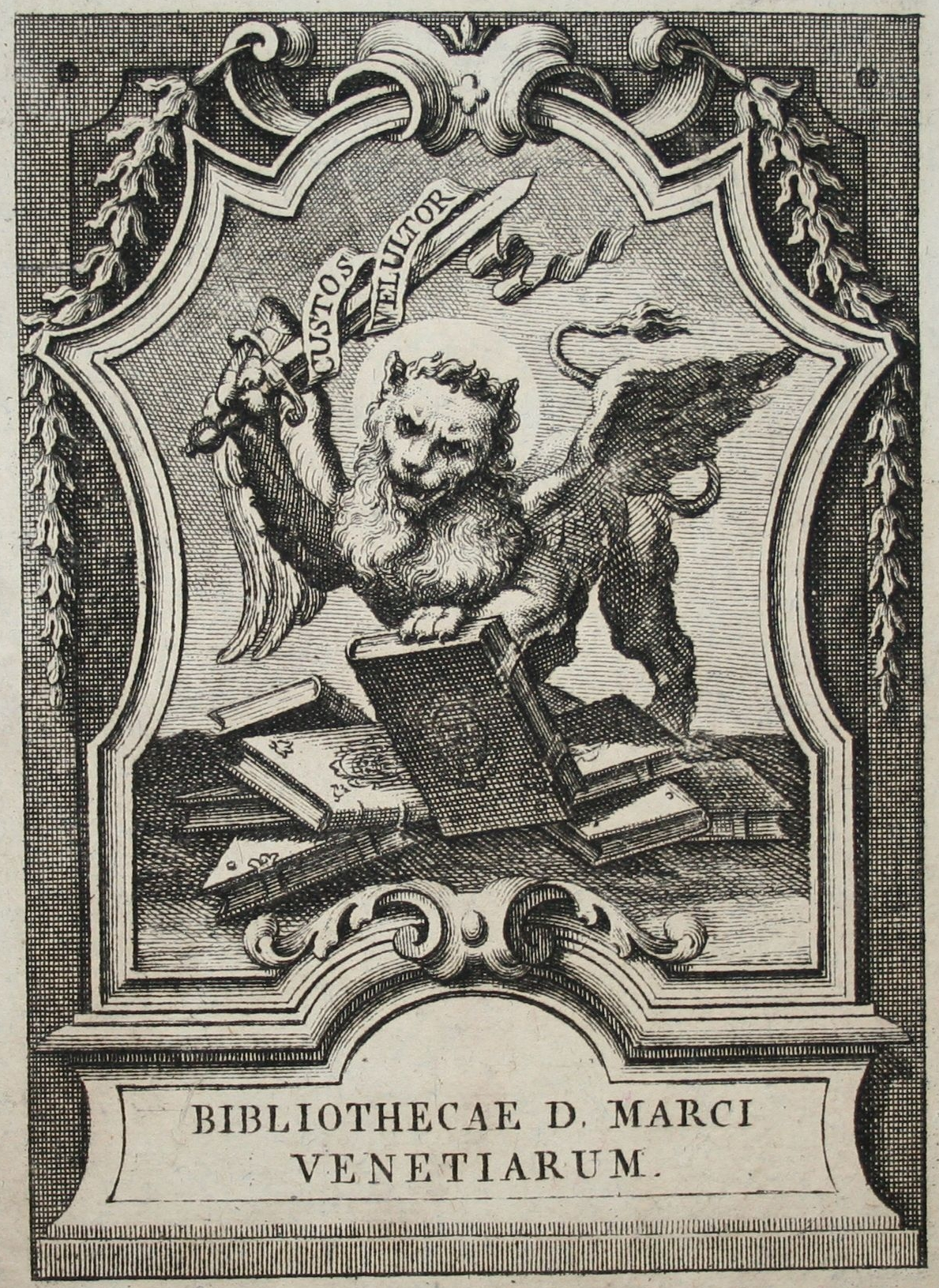
The ex libris of the Marciana Library with the motto "custos vel ultor" (custodian or vindicator), engraved in 1722 and affixed to the collection during the tenure of Girolamo Venier as librarian (1709–1735)

Beginning in 1558, the riformatori nominated the librarian, a patrician chosen for life. But in 1626, the Senate once again assumed direct responsibility for the nomination of the librarian, whose term was limited by the Great Council in 1775 to three years. With few exceptions, the librarians were typically chosen from among the procurators of Saint Mark.

The reform of 1626 established the positions of custodian and attendant, both subordinate to the librarian, with the requirement that the custodian be fluent in Latin and Greek. The attendant was responsible for the general tidiness of the library and was chosen by the procurators, the riformatori, and the librarian. No indications were given regarding the nomination of the custodian, a lifetime appointment, until 1633 when it was prescribed that the election was to be the purview of the riformatori in concert with the librarian. To the custodian fell the responsibility for opening and closing the library: opening days (Monday, Wednesday, and Friday mornings) were also fixed whereas access had previously been by appointment only. The custodian assisted readers, including the international scholars attracted by the importance of the manuscripts. Among these were Willem Canter, Henry Savile, Jacques Gaffarel, and Thomas van Erpe.

The custodian was additionally tasked with showing the library to foreigners who visited primarily to admire the structure and the manuscripts, commenting in their travel diaries on the magnificence of the building, the ancient statuary, the paintings, and on the codices themselves. Notably among these were the English travel-writer Thomas Coryat, the French archaeologist Jacob Spon, the French architect Robert de Cotte, and the German art historian Johann Joachim Winckelmann. (Note: Other noted visitors and travel writers included Fynes Moryson, Charles de Brosses, the Scottish historian Gilbert Burnet, the French palaeographer Jean Mabillon, Richard Lassels, the English music historian Charles Burney, Charles-Nicolas Cochin, Pierre-Jean Grosley, and the French astronomer Jérôme Lalande. See Zorzi, La libreria di san Marco..., pp. 188, 238, 264.)

Truly the beauty of this Librarie is such both for the notable magnificence of the building, and the admirable variety of bookes of all sciences and languages, that I beleeve none of those notable Libraries in ancient times so celebrated by worthy historians, neither that of the royall Ptolomies of Alexandria, burnt by Iulius Cæsar, not that of King Eumenes at Pergamum in Greece, nor Augustus his Palatine in Rome, nor Traians Ulpian, nor that of Serenus Sammonicus, which he left to the Emperor Gordianus the yonger, nor any other whatsoever in the whole world before the time of the invention of printing, could compare with this Palatine. Also I attribute so much unto it that I give it precedence above all the noble Libraries I saw in my travels.

— Thomas Coryat, Coryat's Crudities

In 1680, the Senate accepted the recommendation of the librarian, the future Doge Silvestro Valier (librarian 1679–1694, doge 1694–1700), to better protect the codices by removing them from their chains and putting them inside cabinets. In place of the earlier benches, four large tables were set up for consultation. Further, it was decided to limit loaning, but the library was to now be open daily.

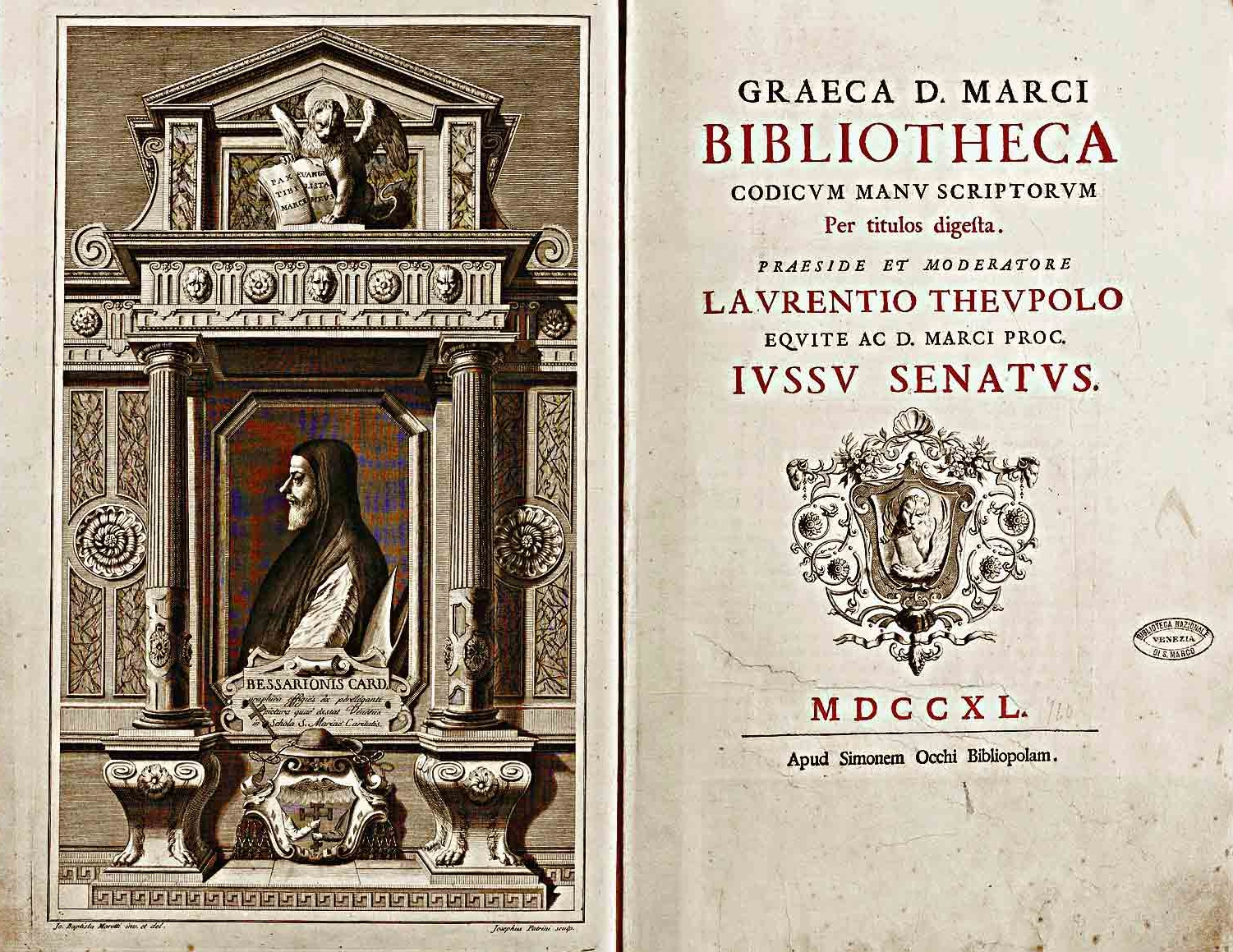

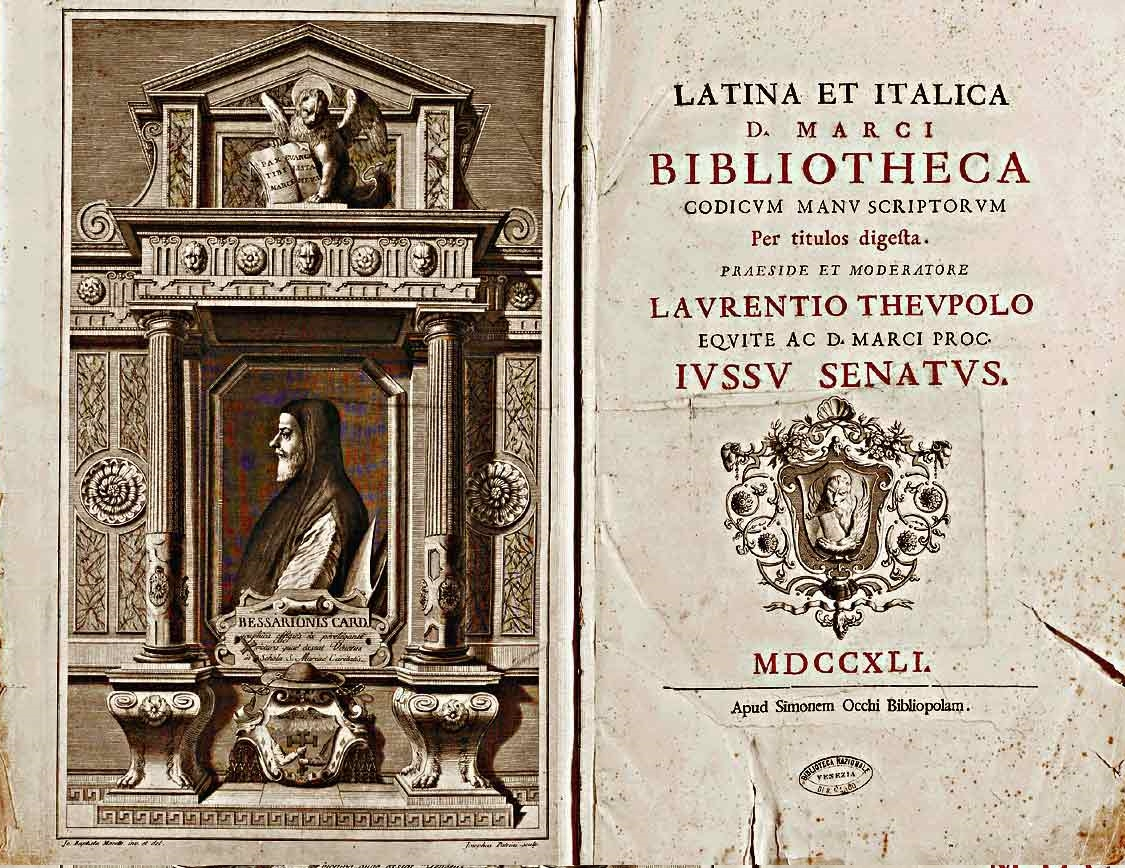
The catalogues of the library, compiled by Antonio Maria Zanetti and Antonio Bongiovanni and published in 1740 and 1741

Developments in library science in the eighteenth century led to increased efforts to organize and protect the manuscripts. Under the influence of important royal libraries, notably in Paris and Vienna, the bindings of all manuscripts were standardized, and an identifying ex libris was added so as to underscore the unity and prestige of the overall collection and its ownership by the republic. Modern catalogues were compiled by the scholarly custodian Antonio Maria Zanetti. These catalogues, printed in 1740 and 1741, largely adhered to the bibliographical guidelines of Bernard de Montfaucon for the library of Henry-Charles de Coislin, bishop of Metz, and identified the shelf mark of each manuscript along with an indication of its age and origin, a physical description, and a list of the texts it contained.

=== French and Austrian administrations ===
After the fall of the Venetian Republic to the French in 1797, the position of librarian, as with all government offices, ceased to exist. The custodian Jacopo Morelli became by default librarian. The name of the library was briefly changed to the Biblioteca nazionale under French occupation (May 1797 – January 1798) but reverted to Libreria pubblica di san Marco at the time of the first period of Austrian rule (1798–1805). During the second period of French domination (1805–1814), it was designated the Regia Biblioteca di Venezia (Royal Library of Venice).

In 1811, the entire collection was moved to the former Hall of the Great Council in the Doge's Palace when the library, as a building, was transformed, together with the adjoining Procuratie Nuove, into an official residence for the viceroy of the Napoleonic Kingdom of Italy. Referred to as the 'Libreria vecchia' (Old Library), the building continued to be used in this capacity in the second period of Austrian rule (1814–1866), whereas the collection, still inside the Doge's Palace, became the Biblioteca Reale di S. Marco di Venezia (Saint Mark's Royal Library of Venice).

=== Italian administration ===
In 1876, after the Third Italian War of Independence and the annexation of Venice to the Kingdom of Italy, the Marciana was designated as a national library, a title that recognizes the library's historical importance but does not involve particular legal jurisdiction within the Italian library system. (Note: The royal decree designating the Marciana as a national library, Num. 3530 dated 12 November 1876, is published in the Gazzetta Ufficiale, Num. 288, 12 December 1876.) Several other libraries share this title, but only two, the libraries in Rome and in Florence, constitute the national central library with the requirement of legal deposit for all publications printed in Italy. The Marciana receives copies of the books that are printed by local publishers. (Note: As per Law 106/2004 and the relative applicable decree DPR 252/2006, a publisher has legal deposit requirements on the basis of its legal seat, regardless of the printing location. See Biblioteca Nazionale Marciana (official website), Deposito legale [accessed 2 July 2020])

The collection was moved from the Doge's Palace to the Zecca, the former mint, in 1904. It is Italian national property, and the library is a state library that depends upon the General Direction for Libraries and Authors' Rights (Direzione Generale Biblioteche e Diritto d'Autore) of the Ministry of Cultural Heritage and Activities and Tourism (Ministero per i Beni e le Attività Culturali e per il turismo). (Note: The General Direction for Libraries and Authors' Rights was formerly the General Direction for Libraries and Cultural Institutions (Direzione Generale Biblioteche e Istituti Culturali)) The General Direction provides financial support and administrative assistance. The Central Institute for Archive and Book Pathology (Istituto Centrale per la Patologia degli Archivi e del Libro) specifically gives guidance with regard to the preservation and restoration of parchment and paper. The Marciana also participates in the National Library Service of Italy which seeks to standardize cataloguing among public, private, and university libraries through the Central Institute for the Union Catalogue of Italian Libraries and for Bibliographic Information (Istituto centrale per il catalogo unico delle biblioteche italiane e per le informazioni bibliografiche). This involves the creation of a single database for the collections held by the various institutions.

Under Italy, the 'Libreria vecchia' passed to the Italian Crown, which ceded ownership to the state in 1919. The Marciana came into possession of the historical rooms of the library in 1924. These underwent extensive restoration and were reopened to the public in 1929 as a museum. (Note: The historical rooms are presently included on the Saint Mark's Square Museum Ticket. [accessed 26 May 2020])

== Collection ==
The Venetian government viewed the possession of the valuable codices as a source of civic pride and prestige for the republic. Little was done initially to facilitate public access to the library or to improve services to readers. Inventories were sporadically conducted, but no acquisition policy was established for the continued incrementation of the collection. Only two new manuscripts, both donations, entered into the library before the inventory of 1575. Although an attempt was made in 1603 to increase the library's holdings by legally requiring that a copy of all books printed within the territory of the Venetian Republic be henceforth deposited in the Marciana, the law had little initial effect due to lack of enforcement. (Note: Only an estimated 50 books were deposited in the 19 years following the passage of the law. See Raines, 'Book Museum or Scholarly Library?...', p. 41 (note 42).) (Note: The requirement (the first such requirement in Italy) was part of the law of 21 May 1603 that regulated the printers' guild. See also Horatio Brown, The Venetian Printing Press: an Historical Study (London: J. C. Nimmo, 1891), pp. 218–221.) Similarly disregarded was the Senate's decree in 1650, requiring that the procurators allocate funds annually for the acquisition of new books. Nevertheless, a series of individual bequests began in 1589 and greatly expanded the collection over time. The requirement for printers to deposit copies of new books was also increasingly enforced, beginning in the early eighteenth century. In addition, from 1724 onward, the Senate appropriated annual funding for the acquisition of newly printed foreign books so as to ensure that the collection remained up-to-date. Concurrently, the library began to sell books of marginal interest or little value, primarily books obligatorily deposited by printers, and then use the proceeds to purchase works of cultural importance in order to maintain the quality of the overall collection.

=== Bessarion's Library ===
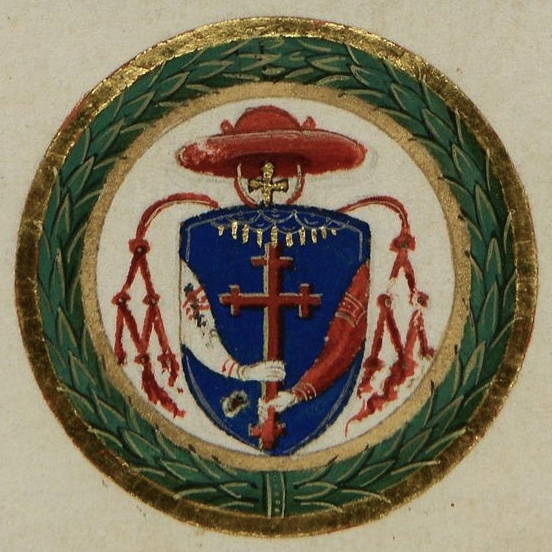
Coat of arms of Cardinal Bessarion

The private library of Cardinal Bessarion constitutes the historical nucleus of the Marciana. In addition to liturgical and theological texts for reference, Bessarion's library initially reflected his particular interests in ancient Greek history, Platonic philosophy, and science, especially astronomy. Some of these texts were brought by Bessarion when he arrived in Italy (1438) for the Council of Ferrara-Florence; others were shipped at an unknown later date from the Venetian city of Modone (Methoni), near Mystras where Bessarion had studied under Gemistus Pletho. Among the early codices were works by Cyril of Alexandria, Euclid, Ptolemy, and Strabo, some of which were rare, if not unknown, in Western Europe. Elevated to the cardinalate in 1440, Bessarion enjoyed greater financial resources, and he added notable codices, including the precious tenth-century manuscripts of Alexander of Aphrodisias' works and of Ptolemy's Almagest that had once belonged to the library of Pope Boniface VIII.

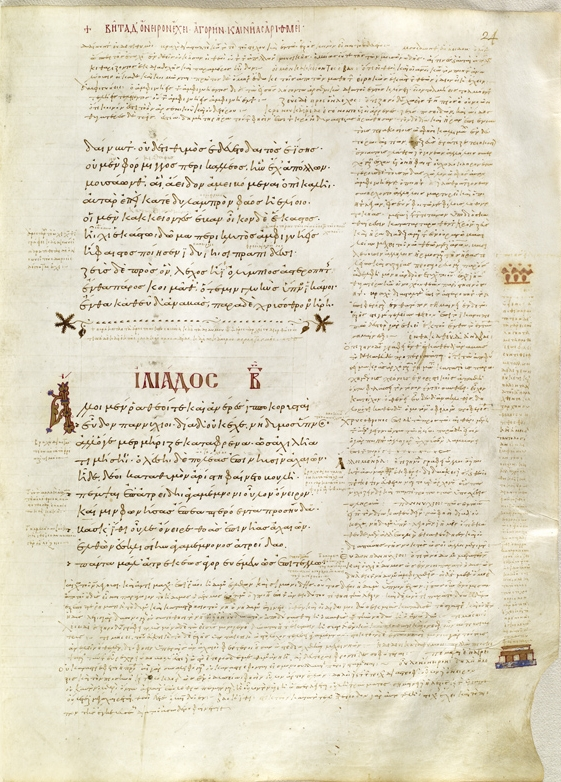
"Venetus A", BNM ms Gr. Z. 454 (=822), fol. 24r. The manuscript, containing the oldest complete text of Homer's epic Iliad, was purchased by Cardinal Bessarion, possibly from Giovanni Aurispa.

Around 1450, Bessarion began to place his ecclesiastical coat of arms on his books and assign shelf marks, an indication that the collection was no longer limited to personal consultation but that he intended to create a lasting library for scholars. In 1454, following the fall of Constantinople to the Ottoman Turks (1453) and the ensuing devastation, he charged Michael Apostolius and Theophanes, bishop of Athens, with the task of locating and purchasing specific works throughout Greece, primarily in Adrianople, Athens, Thessaloniki, Aenos, Gallipoli, and Constantinople, with the objective of preserving the writings of the classical Greek authors and the literature of Byzantium. He also established a scriptorium on Crete, under the direction of Apostolius, where hired scribes copied the texts that could not be found for purchase. A similar scriptorium existed in his Roman residence where other texts were copied. Many of the originals were borrowed for this purpose from the monastery of Santa Croce di Fonte Avellana (Marche) and from several Basilian monasteries in southern Italy, of which Bessarion was nominated protector and apostolic visitor in 1446. These included his discoveries of the Posthomerica by Quintus Smyrnaeus and the Abduction of Helen by Coluthus, which would have otherwise been lost as a result of the Ottoman invasion of Otranto and the destruction of the monastic library of San Nicola di Casole (Apulia) in 1480. Copies of Augustine's complete works were commissioned from the bookseller Vespasiano da Bisticci.

Bessarion acquired several works from Giovanni Aurispa and later from his nephew and heir Nardo Palmieri. These works include the Anthologia Planudea containing 2400 Greek poems, the only autograph copy of the commentary on Homer's Odyssey by Eustathius of Thessalonica, the orations of Demosthenes, Roman History by Cassius Dio, the Bibliotheca of Photius, and the only surviving copy of Deipnosophistae by Athenaeus. "Venetus A" and "Venetus B", the oldest texts of Homer's Iliad, with centuries of scholia, may have also been acquired from Aurispa.

Simultaneously, Bessarion assembled a parallel collection of Latin codices with a relative preponderance of works on patrology, philosophy (primarily the medieval Platonic and Aristotelian traditions), history, mathematics, and literature. Some of these were purchased during his residence in Bologna (1450–1455) or copied from originals in San Giovanni Evangelista (Ravenna), including the works by Quintilian, Lactantius, Augustine, and Jerome. Of particular interest to Bessarion were the Latin historiographers. Among these were Livy and Tacitus. The Latin codices also included translations of Greek works, commissioned by Bessarion. Other Latin codices were purchased during his legation to Germany (1460–1461), notably exegetical and theological works by Nicholas of Lyra and William of Auvergne.

Towards the end of his life, printed books became increasingly available, and Bessarion began to add incunabula to his library, primarily from the printing house of Arnold Pannartz and Konrad Sweynheim in Rome. These books included works by Cicero, Plutarch, Pliny, Quintilian, and Thomas Aquinas as well as the Latin translation of Bessarion's own work in defence of Plato, Adversus calumniatorem Platonis (1469).

The Marciana Library now possesses 548 Greek codices, 337 Latin codices, and 27 incunabula that once belonged to Cardinal Bessarion. Among these are codices with works of Middle Platonic and Neoplatonic authors, many of which constitute the most important, if not the sole, surviving source for their writings.

=== Additions ===
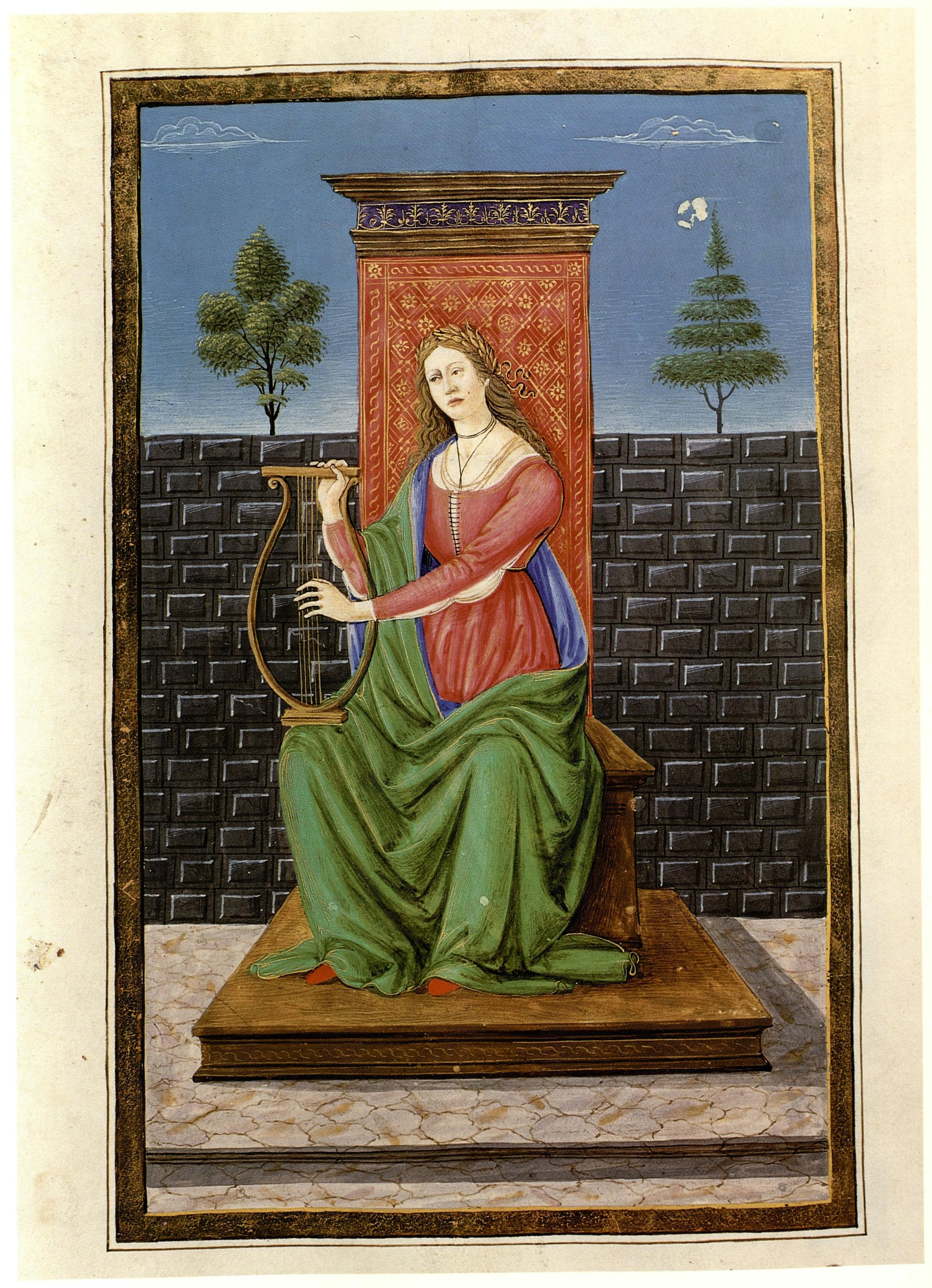
Allegory of Music in De nuptiis Philologiae et Mercurii by Martianus Capella, BNM ms Lat. XIV, 35 (=4054), fol. 149v. The manuscript was made in Florence and later purchased for the Dominican library of Santi Giovanni e Paolo in Venice. In 1789, it was requisitioned by order of the Council of Ten and transferred to the Marciana.

Major additions include:

- 1589 – Melchiorre Guilandino of Marienburg: the bequest of the Prussian-born doctor and botanist, director of the botanical gardens at the University of Padua and professor of botany and pharmacognosy, consisted of 2,200 printed books dealing with philosophy, medicine, mathematics, botany, theology, literature, poetry, and history.
- 1595 – Jacopo Contarini da S. Samuele: the bequest of the Venetian patrician, delayed until the extinction of the male line of the Contarini in 1713, consisted of 175 Greek and Latin manuscripts and 1,500 printed books and included works on Venetian history, Law, poetry, naval and military matters, astronomy, physics, optics, architecture, and philosophy.
- 1619 – Girolamo Fabrici d'Acquapendente: the bequest of the surgeon and professor of anatomy at the University of Padua consisted of 13 volumes with hand-coloured anatomical illustrations.
- 1624 – Giacomo Gallicio: the donation consisted of 21 Greek codices, comprising over 90 works, dealing primarily with exegetics, philology, and philosophy.
- 1734 – Giambattista Recanati: the bequest of the Venetian noble poet and man of letters, member of both the Florentine Academy and the Royal Society of London, consisted of 216 Greek, Latin, Italian, French, Franco-Venetian, and Illyric manuscripts, among which were several medieval illuminated manuscripts once belonging to the House of Gonzaga.
- 1792 – Tommaso Giuseppe Farsetti: the bequest of the Venetian patrician consisted of 386 Latin and Italian manuscripts and over 1600 printed books, primarily literature.
- 1794 – Amedeo Schweyer, called "Svajer": the purchase of the collection of the German-born antiquarian involved more than 340 manuscripts and included genealogies and Venetian and foreign documents, among which is the last will and testament of Marco Polo.
- 1797 – Jacopo Nani: the bequest of the Venetian collector consisted of 716 Greek, Latin, Italian, French, Arabic, Egyptian, Persian, Syrian, and Turkish manuscripts covering history, travel, literature, politics, science, military matters, architecture, philosophy, and religion.
- 1814 – Girolamo Ascanio Molin: the bequest of the Venetian nobleman, collector and author, included 2209 fine printed books and incunabula, 3835 prints, 408 drawings, and 136 maps.
- 1843 – Girolamo Contarini: the bequest of the Venetian nobleman consisted of some 4000 printed books and 956 manuscripts, including 170 musical codices.
- 1852 – Giovanni Rossi: the bequest consisted of 470 manuscripts dealing primarily with Venetian history and a collection of Venetian operas.

Three hundred and three precious manuscripts along with 88 rare printed books were transferred to the Marciana in 1789 from the religious libraries of Santi Giovanni e Paolo, Sant'Andrea della Certosa, and S. Pietro Martire di Murano by order of the Council of Ten after an investigation into a theft revealed unsatisfactory security conditions. Between 1792 and 1795, the Council of Ten also transferred to the Marciana works from its Secret Archives that were no longer considered politically sensitive. These included the scientific writings of Tycho Brahe and Cesare Cremonini, originally presented to the Inquisition for concerns over religious orthodoxy, as well as political documents of historical interest.

After the fall of the Venetian Republic to Napoleon in 1797, 470 precious manuscripts, selected from public, religious, and private libraries throughout Venice, were turned over to the French as prizes of war. Of these, 203 were subtracted from the Marciana along with two musical scores. Similarly, during the first period of Austrian occupation (1798–1805), six rare incunabula and 10 important manuscripts were removed. (Note: As a consequence of the Austrian defeats in 1866 and 1918, most of the volumes were returned as war reparations. See Zorzi, La libreria di san Marco..., p. 355) However, the Marciana obtained 4,407 volumes including 630 manuscripts when during the second period of French occupation (1805–1815), numerous convents and monasteries were suppressed and their libraries dispersed. In 1811, the map of Fra Mauro was transferred from the suppressed Camaldolese monastery of San Michele in Isola.

As of 2019, the collection consists of 13,117 manuscripts; 2,887 incunabula; 24,060 cinquecentine; and 1,000,000 (circa) post-sixteenth-century books. Overall, the Marciana remains specialized in the classics, the humanities, and Venetian history.

== See also ==
- Laurentian Library
- Malatestiana Library
- Vatican Library
