= Loggetta del Sansovino =

Building in Venice, Italy

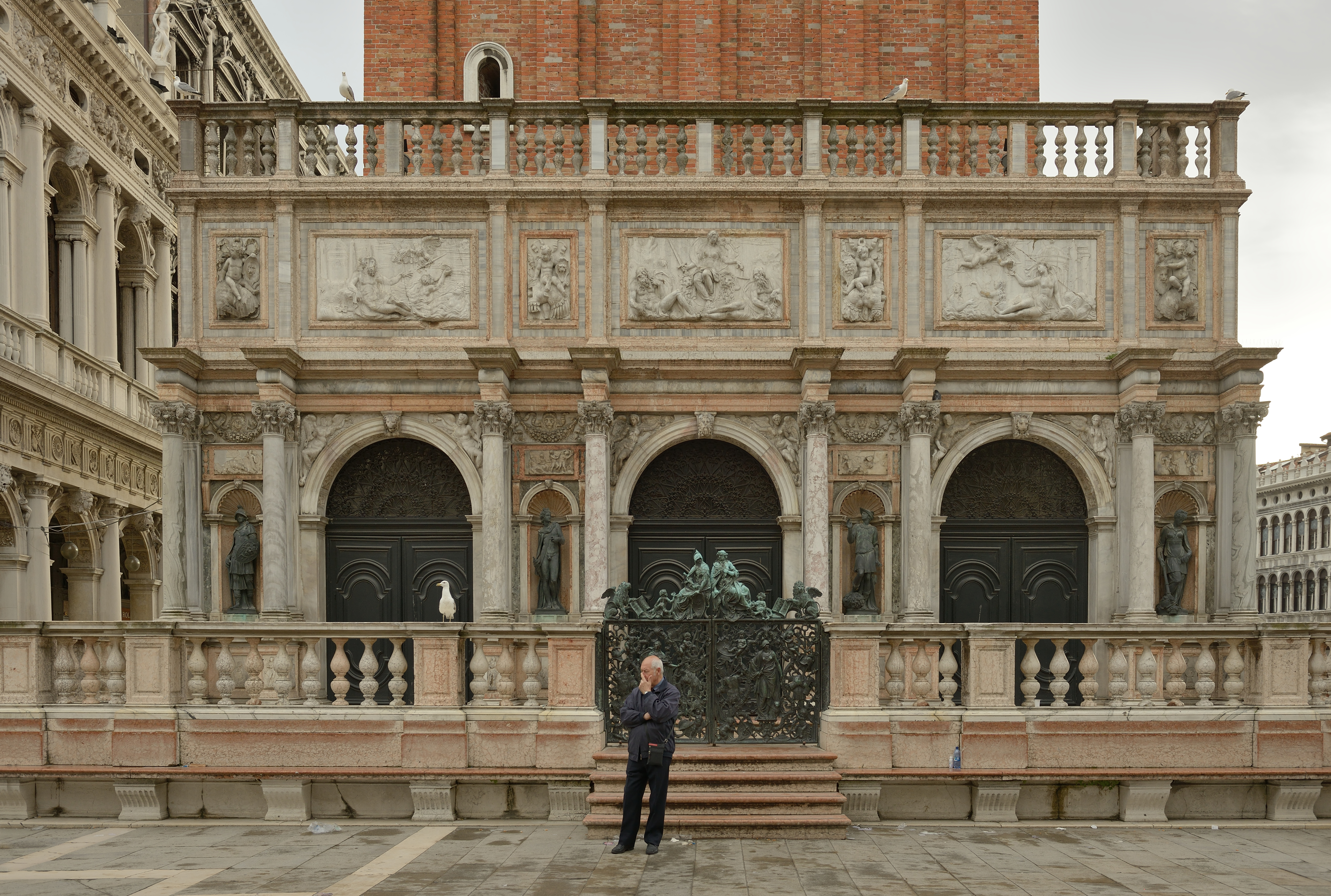
- Main façade
- Location: Venice, Italy
- Coordinates: 45.4341°N 12.3392°E
- Built: 1538–1546
- Rebuilt: 1902–1912
- Architect: Jacopo Sansovino
- Architectural style(s): High Renaissance

The Loggetta is a small, richly decorated building at the base of the bell tower in Saint Mark's Square, Venice, Italy. Built by Jacopo Sansovino between 1538 and 1546, it served at various times as a gathering place for nobles and for meetings of the procurators of Saint Mark, the officials of the Venetian Republic who were responsible principally for the administration of the treasury of the Church of Saint Mark and for the public buildings around Saint Mark's Square.

Because of its location directly in front of the Porta della Carta, the most important entry to the Doge's Palace, the loggetta was also used from 1569 onward as a sentry post to provide security for the assembled nobles during the meetings of the Great Council: three procurators were to be present, assisted by an armed squadron of workers from the Arsenal, the government shipyard, in order to counter any popular assault and respond to any fire. Beginning in 1734, it was additionally the site for the extraction of winning tickets in the public lottery.

The loggetta was largely destroyed in the collapse of the bell tower in 1902, but it was rebuilt using what original material could be salvaged, amounting to about half of the present building. At the same time the sides, which had originally been left in plain brick as other lean-to structures backed onto them, were rebuilt in the style of the main facade. The building serves as the entrance to the tower elevator.

== Historical background ==
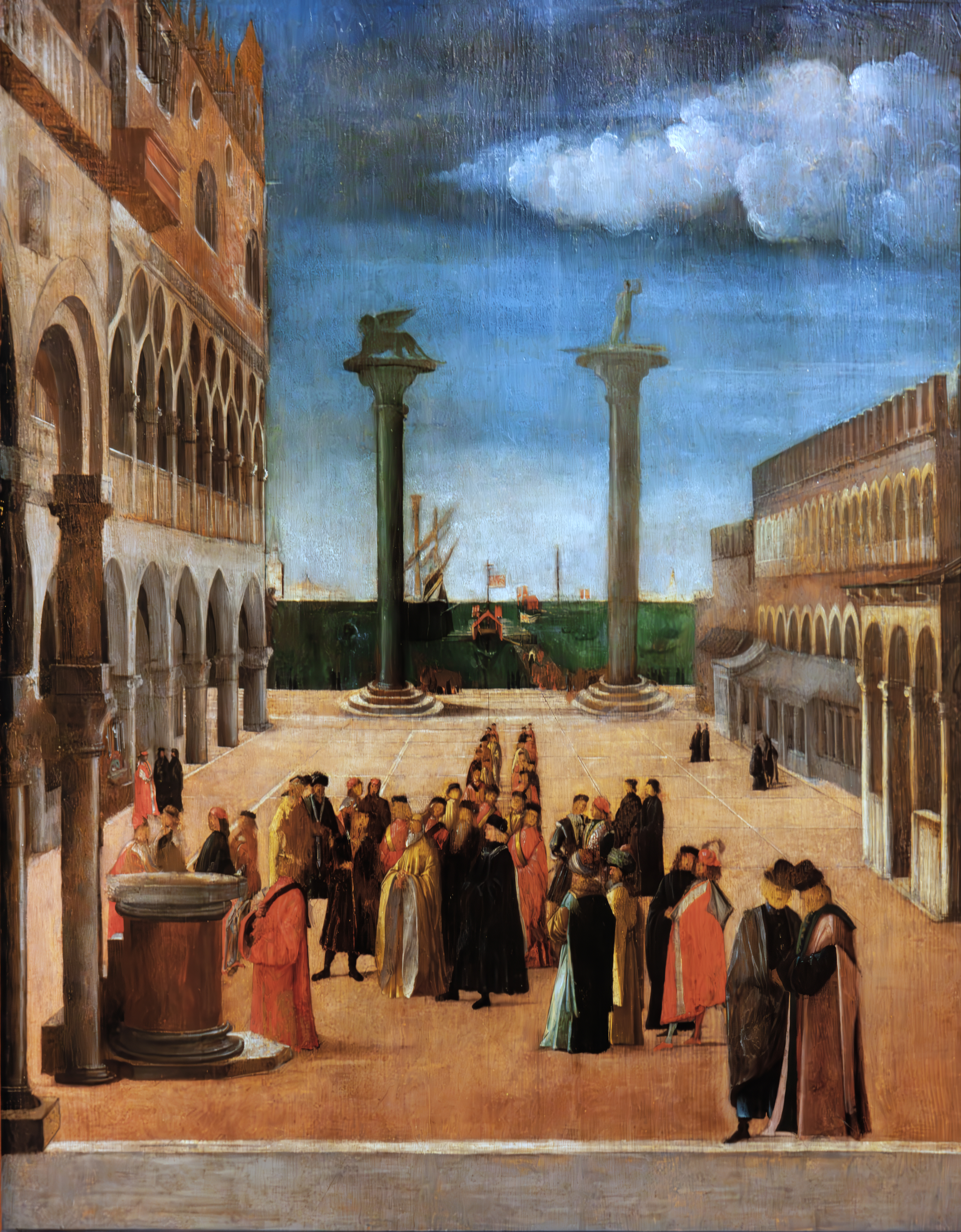
Lazzaro Bastiani (attributed), La Piazzetta di San Marco (c. 1487), Venice, Museo Correr

Covered exterior galleries, referred to as loggias and intended as public gathering places, were normally built in Venice against church façades, such as the surviving examples of San Giacomo di Rialto and San Nicolò dei Mendicoli. A similar structure was also attached to the building of the Camerlenghi at Rialto as a meeting place for nobles to discuss business affairs in the commercial centre of the city. Furnished with maps and paintings, this structure, visible in Vittore Carpaccio's Miracle of the Relic of the Cross at the Ponte di Rialto (c. 1496) and in Jacopo de' Barbari's panoramic view of Venice (1500), was not rebuilt after the fire that devastated the Rialto market in 1514.

From the end of the thirteenth century until the second half of the seventeenth century, a loggia also existed in Saint Mark's Square as a gathering place for nobles whenever they came to the square on government business. Although it was attached to the Church of San Basso, it was under the jurisdiction of the procurators of Saint Mark de supra who were responsible specifically for the public buildings around the square.

In the fifteenth century, the procurators erected a second loggia, attached to the bell tower. Visible in La Piazzetta di San Marco (c. 1487), attributed to Lazzaro Bastiani, it was a lean-to wooden structure, partially enclosed, that consisted in a triple arcade supported on four stone columns. Over time, it was repeatedly damaged by falling masonry from the bell tower as a result of storm and earthquake but was repaired after each incident. However, when lightning struck the bell tower on 11 August 1537 and the loggia underneath was once again damaged, it was decided to completely rebuild the structure. The commission was given to the sculptor and architect Jacopo Sansovino, the proto (consultant architect and buildings manager) of the procurators of Saint Mark de supra.

== Building ==
=== Construction ===
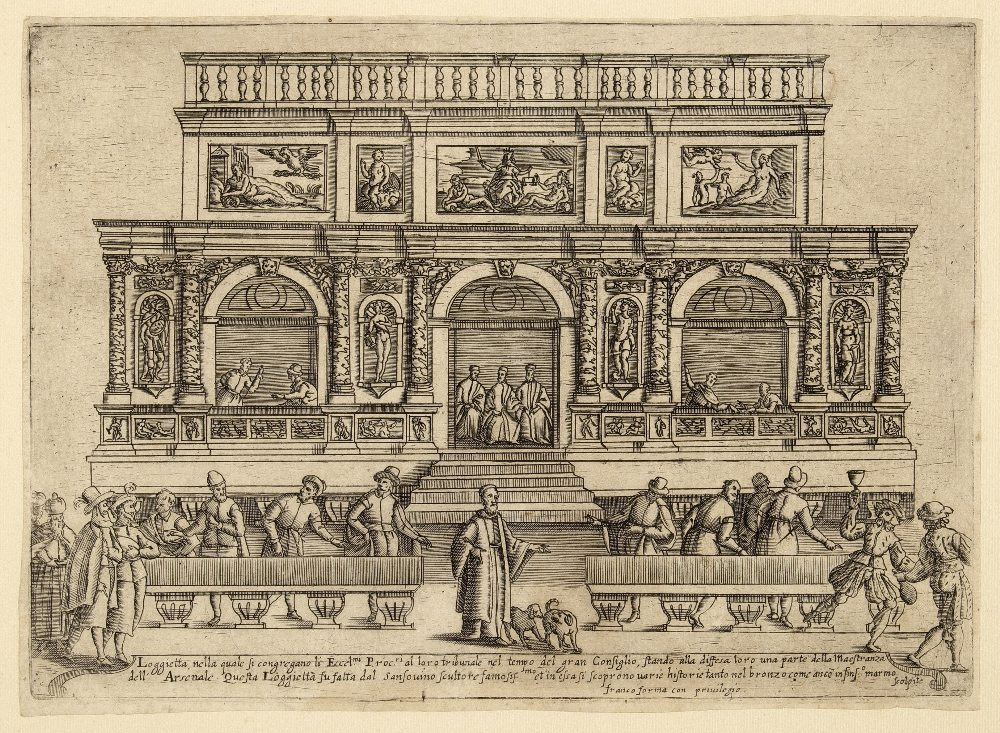
Engraving of the Loggetta. Source: Giacomo Franco, Habiti d'huomeni et donne venetiane, 1610, Venetia

Saint Mark's Square

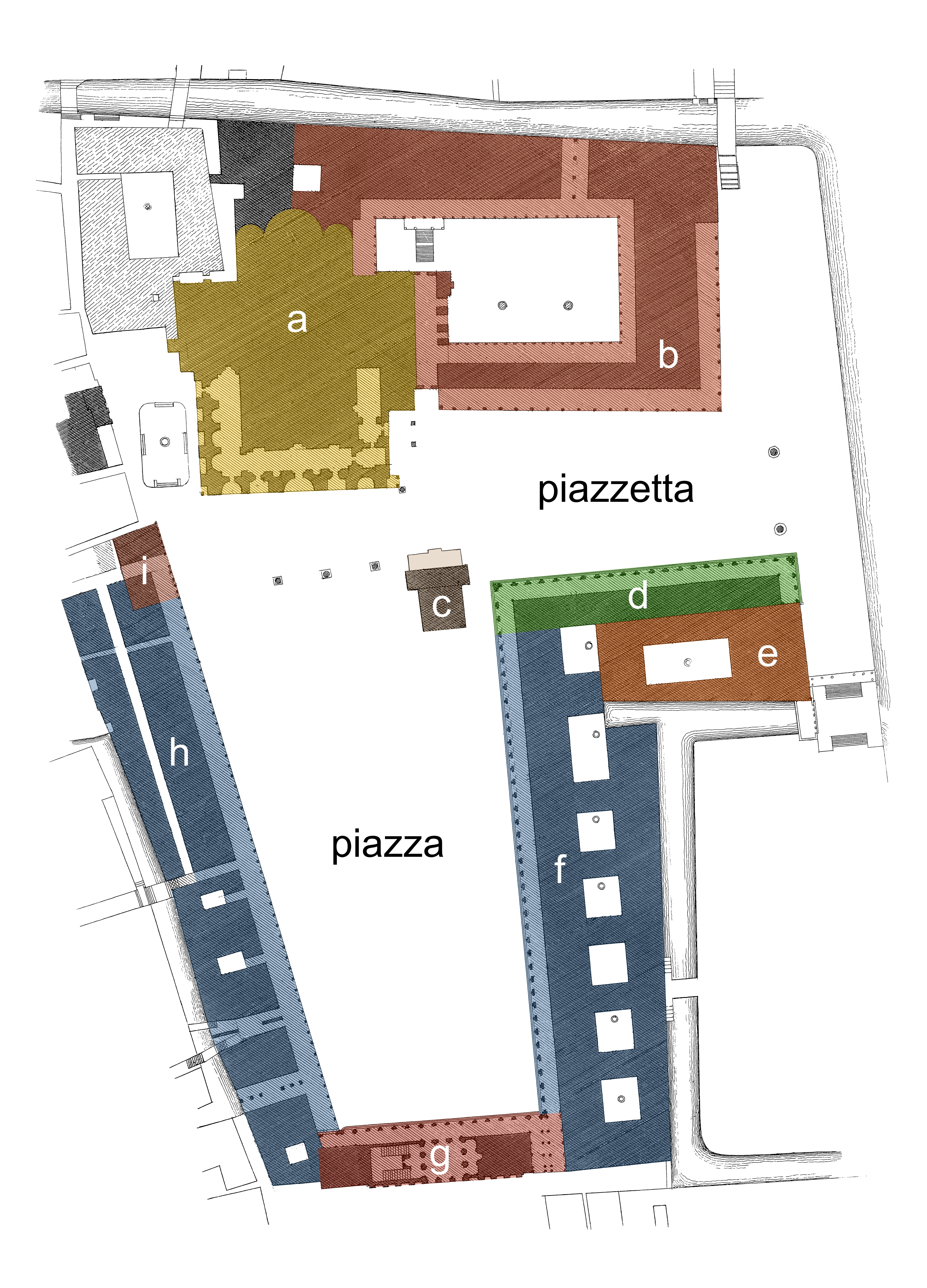
a. Saint Mark's Basilica
b. Ducal Palace
c. Bell tower and Loggetta
d. Marciana Library
e. Mint
f. Procuratie Nuove
g. Napoleonic wing
h. Procuratie Vecchie
i. Clock tower

The building of the loggetta was a part of the renovatio urbis, the ambitious programme of architectural renewal, begun under Doge Andrea Gritti, that was aimed at reaffirming Venice's international prestige after the earlier defeat at Agnadello during the War of the League of Cambrai and the subsequent Peace of Bologna which sanctioned Habsburg hegemony on the Italian peninsula at the end of the War of the League of Cognac. It amounted to the transformation of Saint Mark's Square from an antiquated medieval town centre with food vendors, money changers, and even latrines into an imposing public forum in emulation of ancient Rome. Specifically, the loggetta was modelled along the lines of ancient triumphal arches and was intended as a monumental backdrop to provide a sense of grandeur to public ceremonies. Many of the key architectural elements, including the paired columns and niches with statues, had in fact already been employed by Sansovino for the temporary wooden arches that he designed and erected in Florence in 1514 for the ceremonial entry of Pope Leo X into the city the previous year.

Although the small brick structure was quickly erected between 1538 and 1540, in part with building materials recuperated from the old Church of San Francesco della Vigna, concerns about the magnitude of the overall architectural programme (which included the library) and the associated expenses for the coffers of the procurators of Saint Mark de supra led to a brief suspension of work and the decision to simplify the design by leaving the brick of the side walls exposed. The sides were however partially obscured when the lean-to structures around the perimeter of the bell tower were subsequently extended along the sides of the loggetta in order to provide an additional source of rental income to the procurators. Work resumed, and by January 1541 the basic structure was complete when the leaden roof was applied.

=== Architecture ===
The principal model for the loggetta was likely the Arch of Constantine in Rome with three prominent arches alternating with projecting columns that are displayed as trophies on high pedestals. The design of the niches with statues placed between paired columns may also derive from Donato Bramante's design for the marble screen within the Church of the Sacra Casa in Loreto. But the specific choice of composite capitals, combined with a convex pulvinated frieze, was probably inspired from the tomb of Pope Adrian VI in Santa Maria dell'Anima.

=== Materials ===
Given its small size, the loggetta cost the relatively considerable sum of 4,258 ducats and 14 grossi due to the lavish stone facing. The rich polychromatic effect, obtained by employing a number of rare stones and costly marbles, is reminiscent of the interior of the Pantheon, of Raphael’s Chigi Chapel in Santa Maria del Popolo (begun c. 1512), and of Baldassare Peruzzi's tomb of Pope Adrian VI in Santa Maria dell'Anima (1523–1530), all constructions with which Sansovino was likely familiar from his second period in Rome (1516–1527).

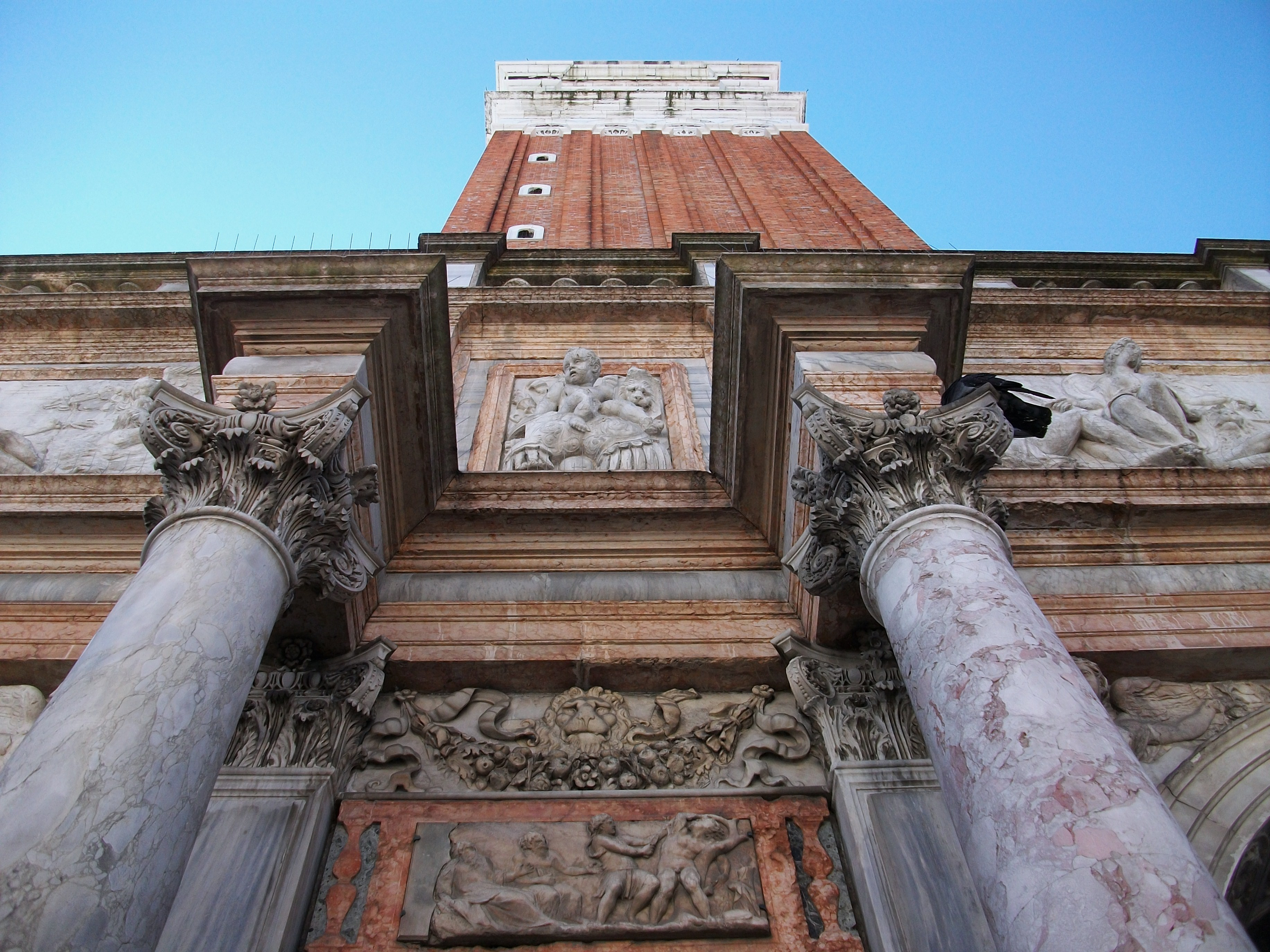
Detail of the polychromatic façade showing oriental breccias, marbles from Verona and Carrara, limestone from Istria, and lapis lacedaemonius from Greece.

Locally available red Verona marble is used for much of the structure: the cornices, crowning balustrade, the panelling inside the niches, and the frames of the upper reliefs. The balustrade also contains opalescent lumachelle from the valley of San Vitale near Verona, noted for its fossilized mollusk shells. White Istrian stone, easily carved, is used for the relief sculptures. The authentic antique columns (only three of which survived the collapse of the bell tower in 1902) are made out of breccias from Asia and Africa and are positioned so that the colour and texture of the angular fragments of pre-existing rocks in the stone become progressively more pronounced moving towards the central columns. The lesenes behind the columns, the convex pulvinated frieze of the main entablature, and the capitals are in white Carrara marble veined with grey. Precious dark green lapis lacedaemonius (verde antico), found exclusively in the Peloponnese, is employed for the accents around the niches.

=== Sculpture ===
Statues

The combination of polychromatic marbles with bronze is also reminiscent of Raphael's Chigi Chapel. But in the loggetta, the bronze is more prominent as it is the material employed for the four large statues. These were designed by Sansovino on the basis of an allegorical programme conceived by the Procurator Antonio Cappello with the intention of glorifying the Republic and exalting its intrinsic virtues in a public space. The architect's son, Francesco Sansovino, elaborates the significance of the statues in both L'Arte oratoria secondo i modi della lingua volgare (1546) and Venetia, città nobilissima et singolare (1581), specifying in the latter publication that he obtained the explanation directly from his father.

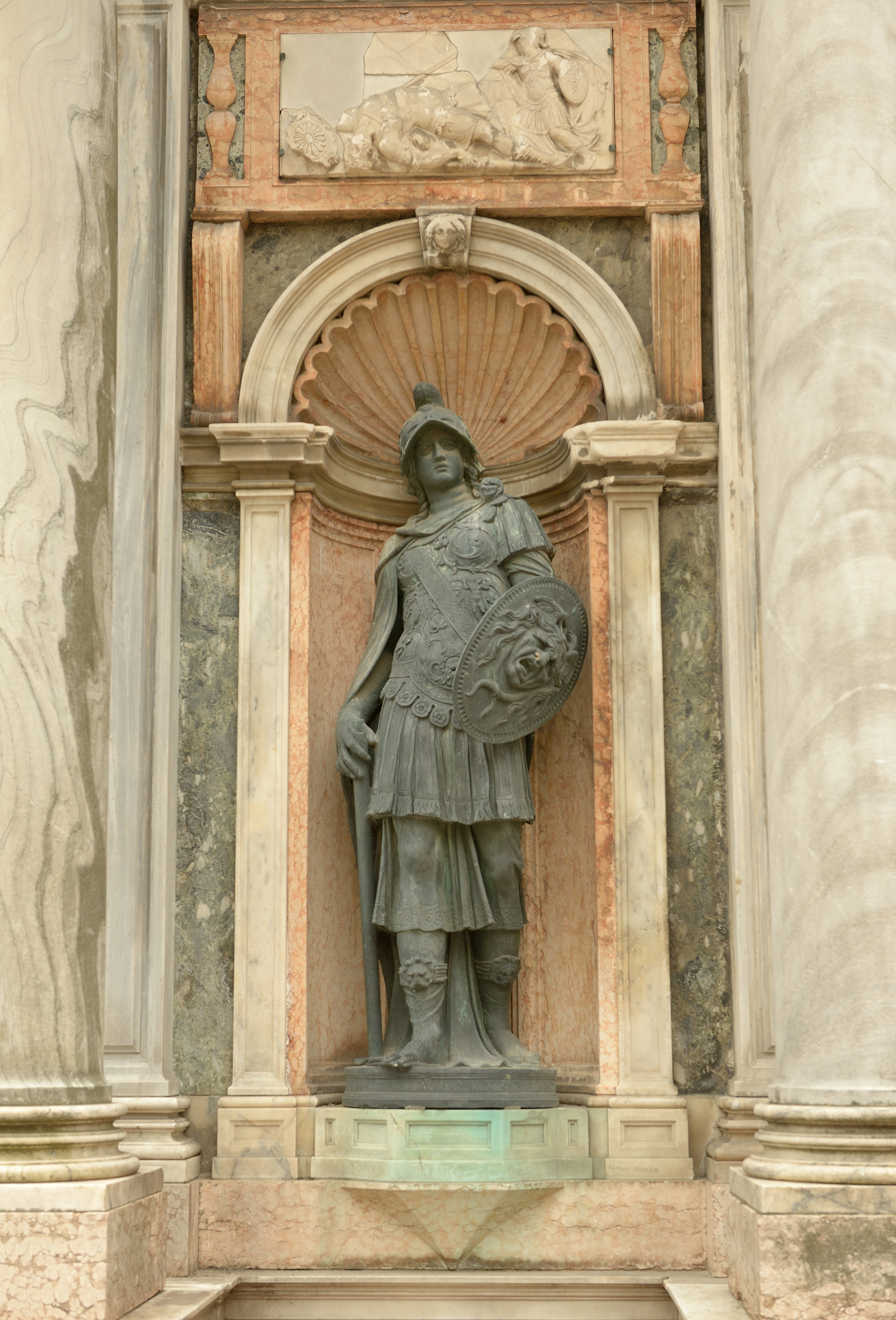
Pallas (Athena)

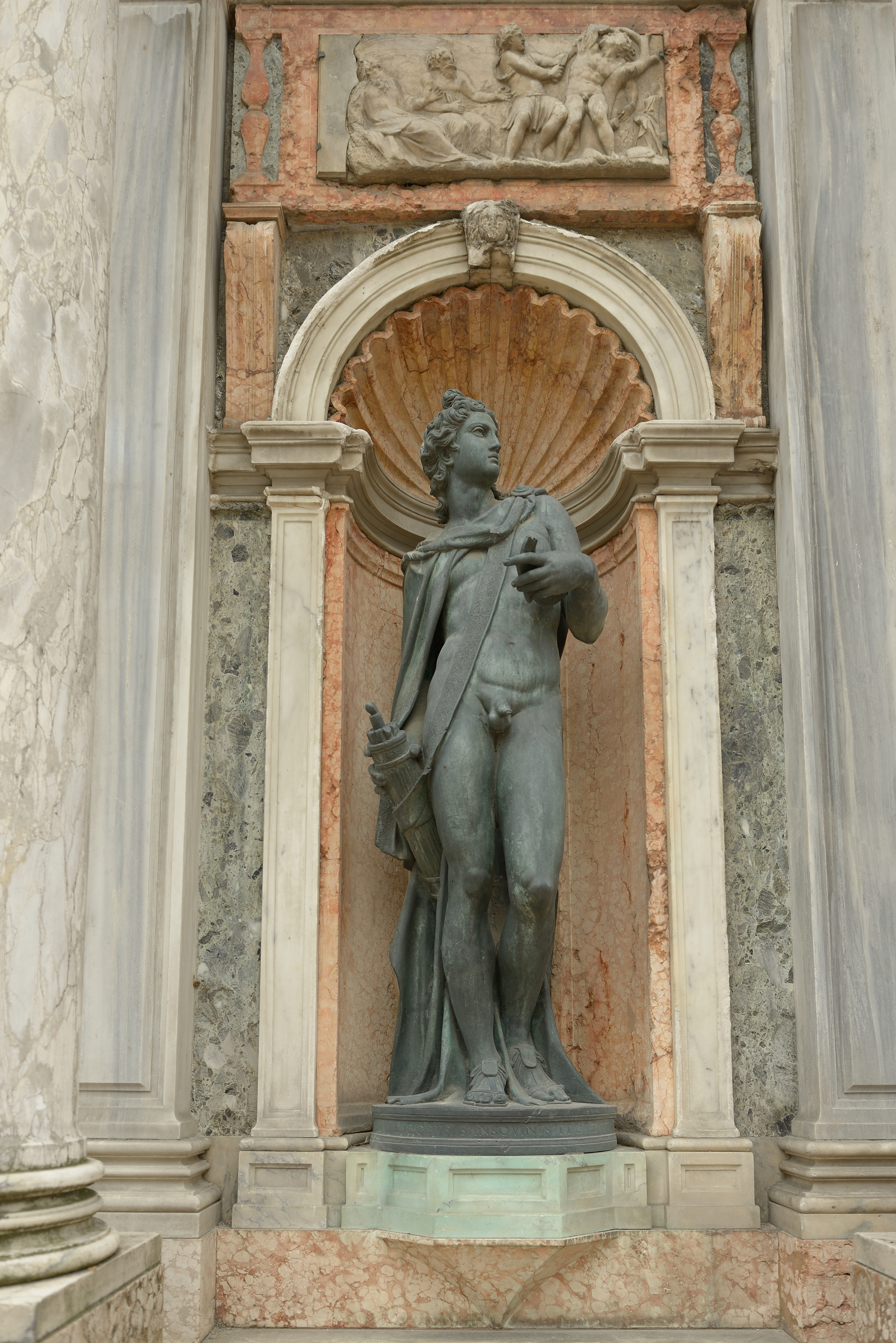
Apollo

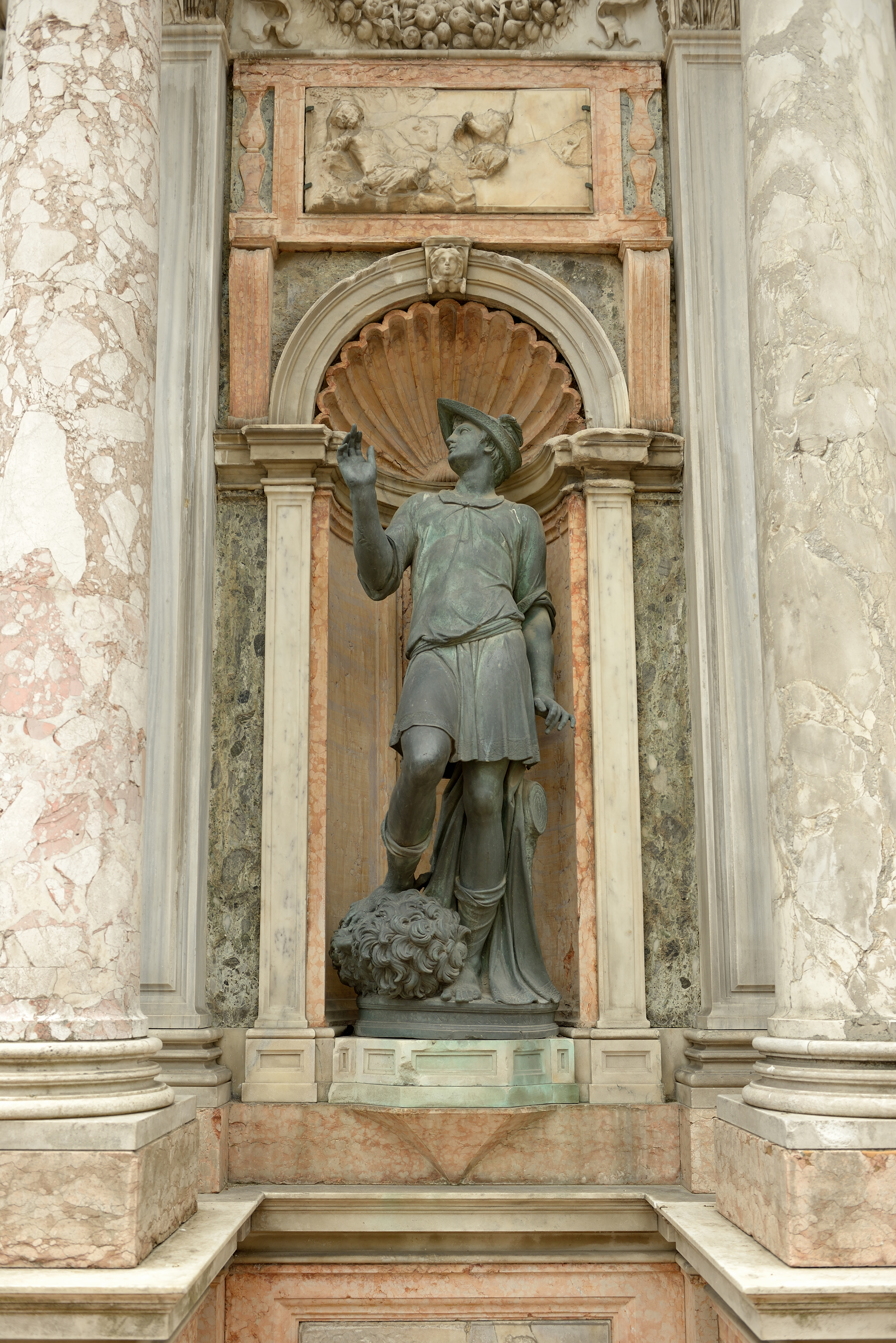
Mercury

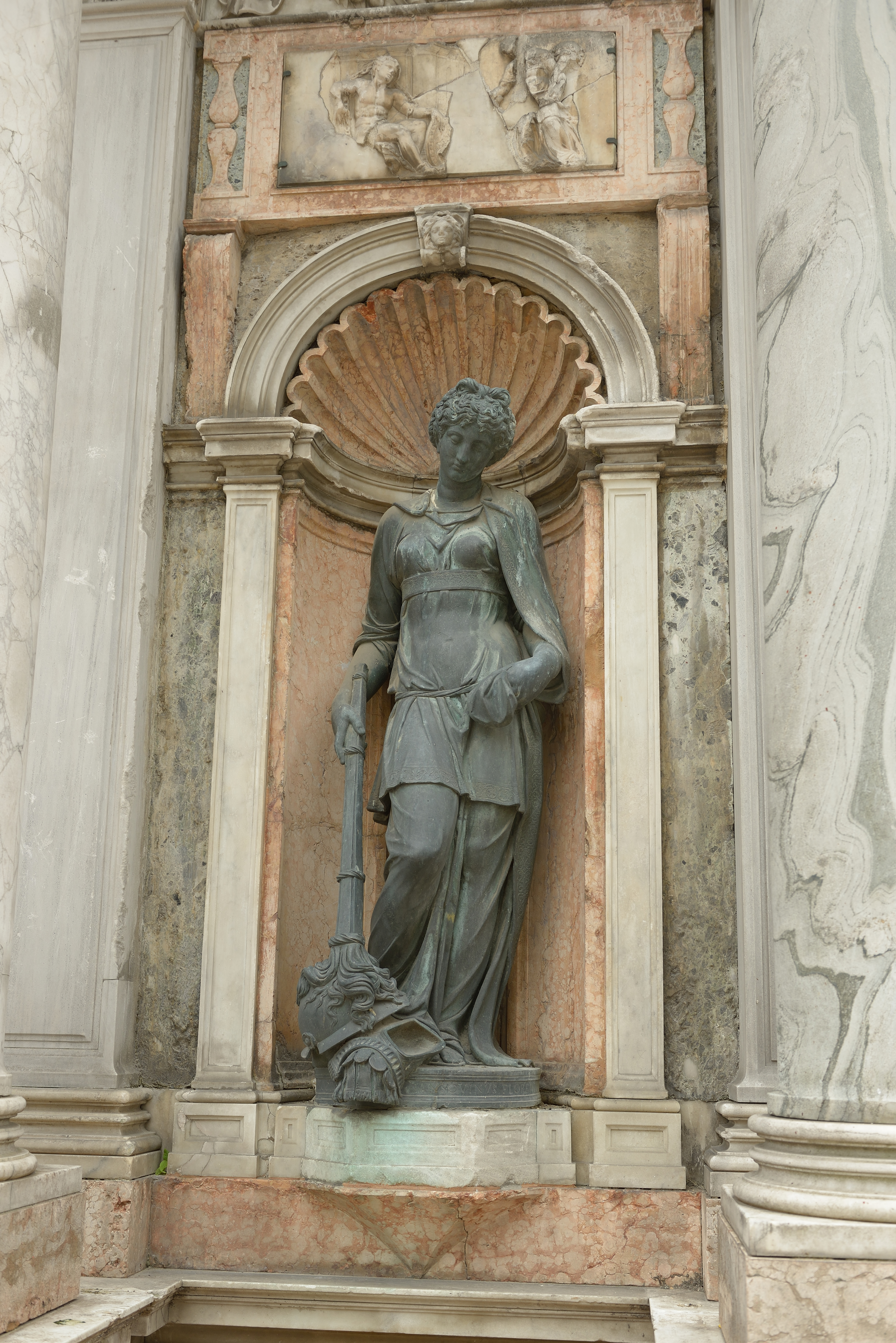
Pax

Francesco Sansovino identifies the leftmost statue as Pallas, an epithet for Athena. Characterized by her medusa shield, Athena is an allegory for wisdom and righteousness, as well as the goddess of war. This may have signified the righteousness of the Venetian patriciate, as well as Venetian naval prowess.

Apollo, as the god of the one sun (Sole), allegorizes the uniqueness of the Republic and of its government. In addition, as the god of music, he alludes to the perfect constitutional harmony between the various councils and magistrates which ensures the stability and longevity of the state. On the loggetta, he is portrayed with a quiver and arrows as symbols of the piercing solar rays. The lyre is now missing from his left hand.

Mercury, the god of eloquence, underscores that Venice's wise and prudent decisions are eloquently expressed by the nobles. The god is shown with the severed head of Argus at his feet. The caduceus is missing from his right hand.

Pax represents the peace, beloved by the Republic, which ensures its greatness. The statue of the goddess shows her extinguishing her torch on the armour that lays cast-off at her feet.

Reliefs

The three reliefs in the attic are the work of Sansovino's collaborators Danese Cattaneo and Tiziano Aspetti. They allegorize Venice and its principal subject territories of Crete and Cyprus.

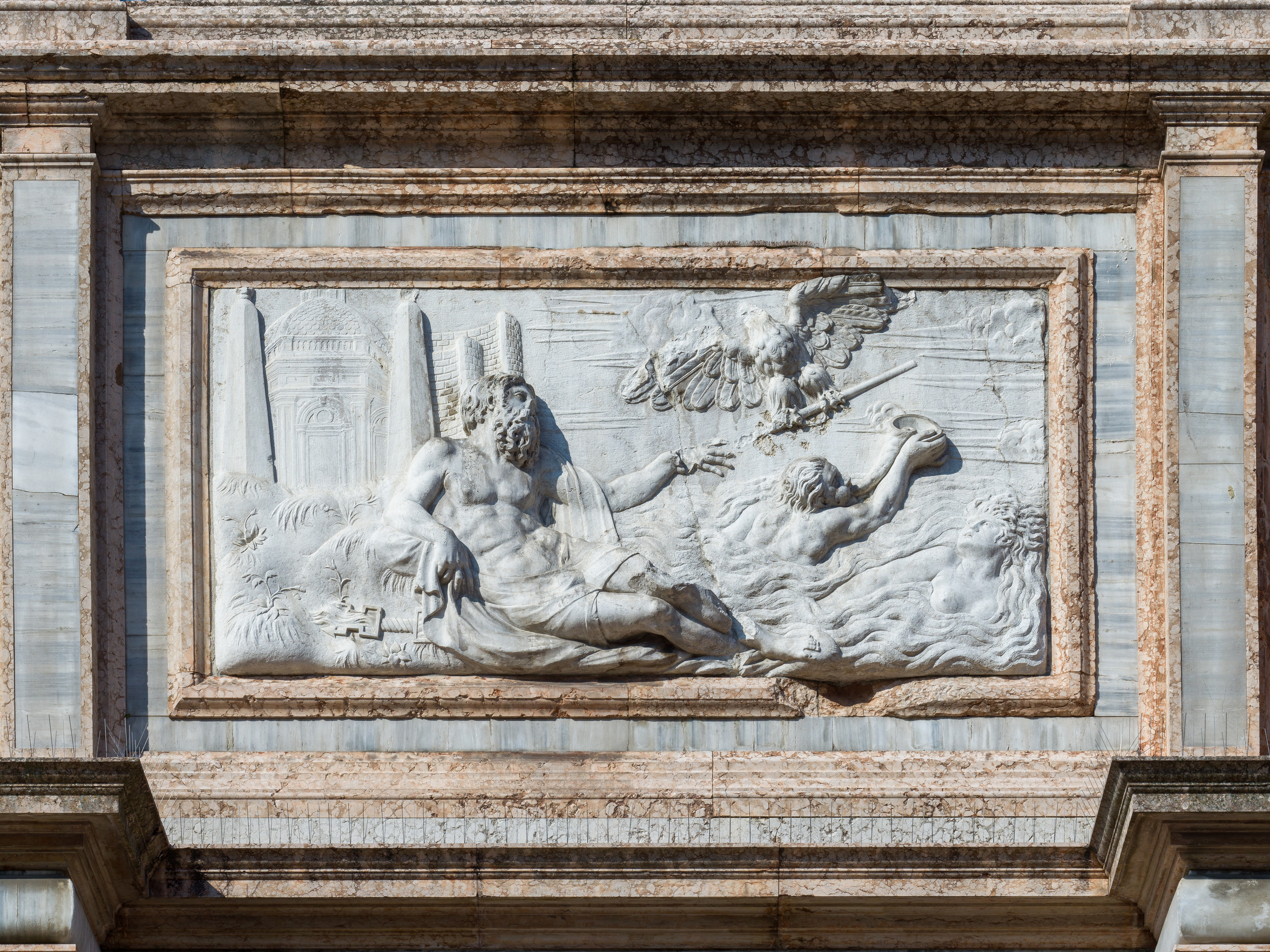
Jupiter as
an allegory of Crete

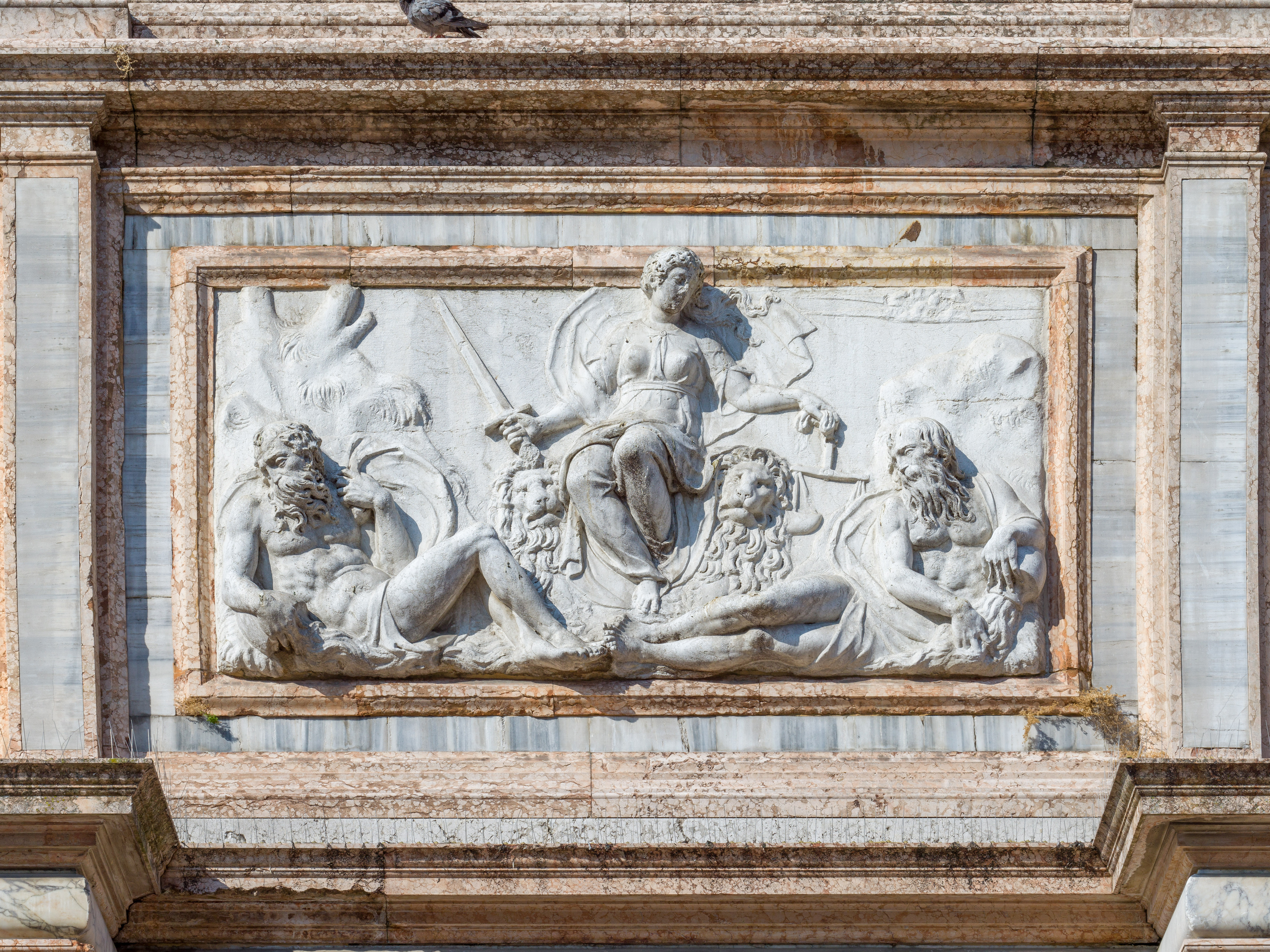
Venice as
Justice

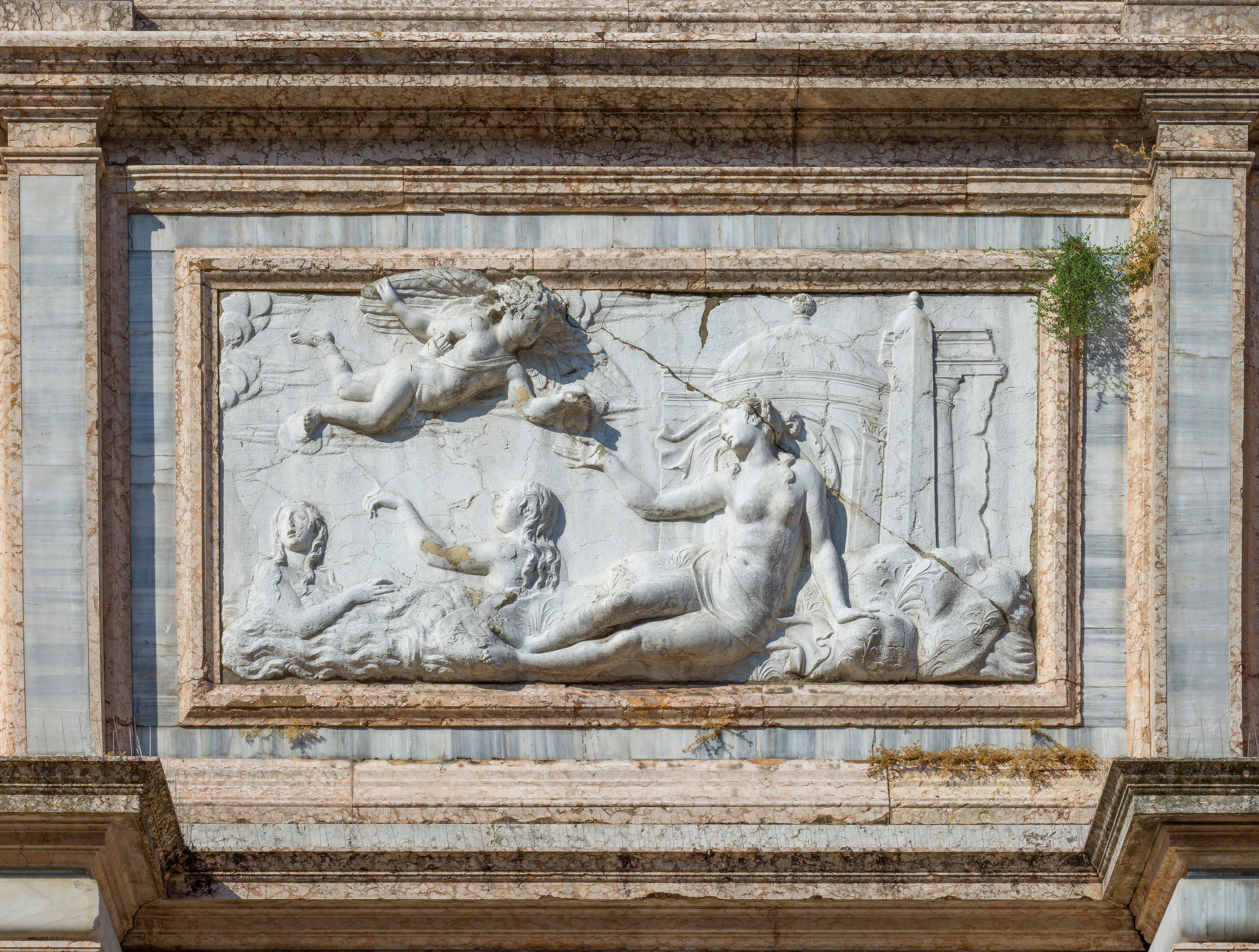
Venus as
an allegory of Cyprus

The central relief shows Venice as Justice with the sword and scales. She sits upon a throne supported by lions in allusion to her Solomonic wisdom. On either side the figure is flanked by river gods with water flowing from urns in reference to the subject territories on the Italian mainland. The territory of Crete, under Venetian rule from 1205 to 1669, is presented as Jupiter who was raised on Mount Aigaion on Crete and fathered Minos, the first king of the island. Cyprus, annexed to Venice in 1489 and ceded to the Ottoman Turks in 1573, is shown as Venus who was born from the waters near the island.

=== Later modifications ===
1653–1663

In conjunction with reparations made necessary after lightning struck the bell tower, Baldassare Longhena, the consultant architect and buildings manager for the procurators of Saint Mark de supra from 1640 to 1682, replaced the five steps in front of the loggetta and the external benches with a wide terrace and balustrade. The two lateral windows were reduced to half lunettes with iron grillwork in the upper portion, and doors were added.

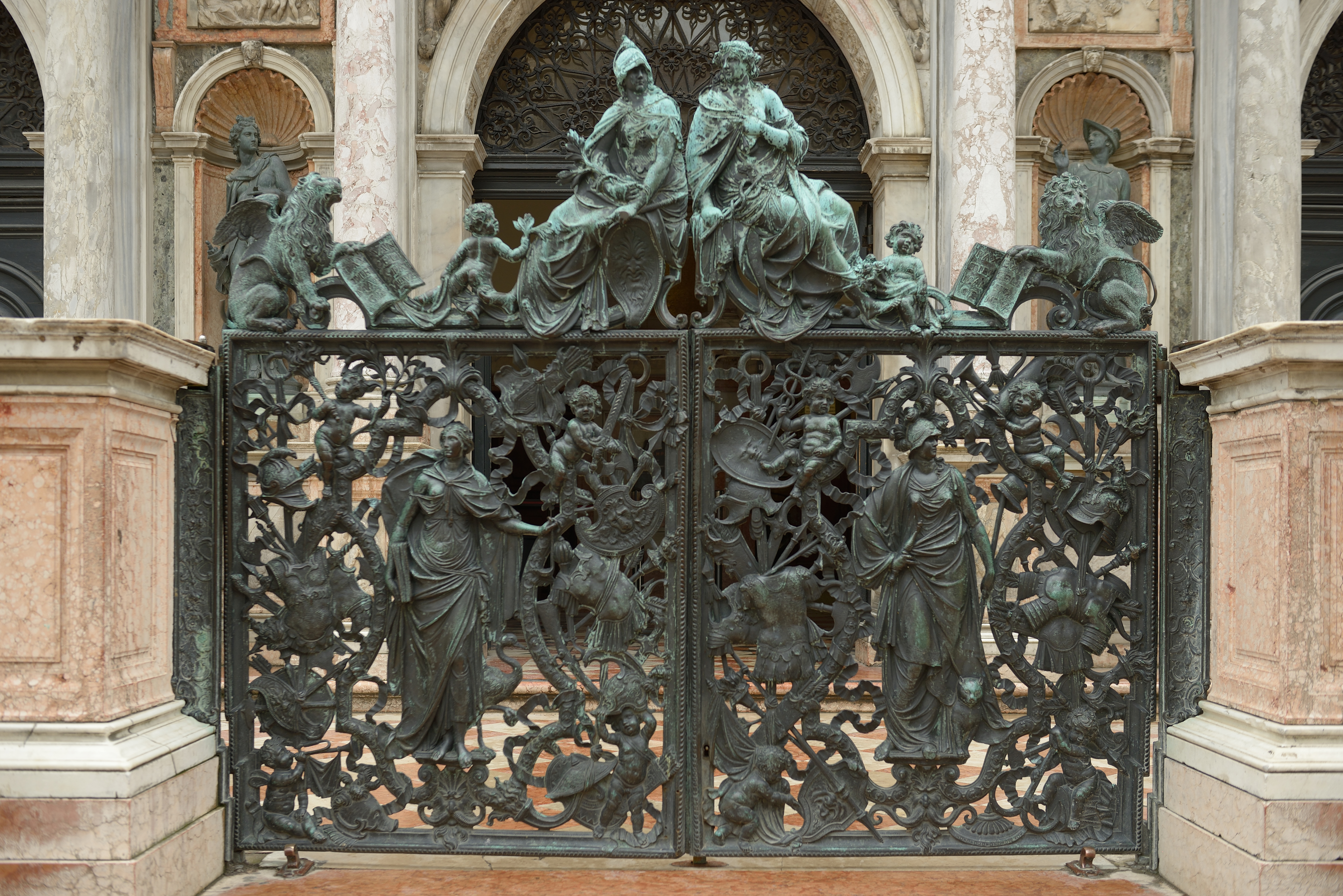
The bronze gate, made by Antonio Gai between 1733 and 1734

1733–1750

Antonio Gai realized the elaborate bronze gate (1733–1734) with the allegorical figures of Vigilance (on the left with the lighted lamp and the crane holding a pebble with its foot) and Liberty (on the right with the pileus on a staff). The gate is surmounted by Armed Peace (to the left with a helmet and an olive branch) and Public Happiness (to the right with the caduceus and a cornucopia).

Giorgio Massari widened the attic between 1749 and 1750. The marble reliefs of the two putti on the external wings of the elevation were carved by Antonio Gai.

1876–1885

The original medieval loggetta had been covered on both sides with lean-to wooden stalls for shops which continued along the perimeter of the bell tower. Important sources of rental income for the procurators of Saint Mark de supra, they were rebuilt in 1550 alongside Sansovino's structure and existed until 1873 when they were finally demolished. This completely exposed the lateral brick walls which had only partial three-light windows in the upper parts in order to accommodate for the lean-to structure below. It was consequently decided to extend the window frames downward using as a model the window, derived from Bramante's Santa Maria delle Grazie in Milan and the nymphaeum at Genazzano near Rome, that Sansovino himself had employed for the high altar of San Martino in Venice.

== Reconstruction ==
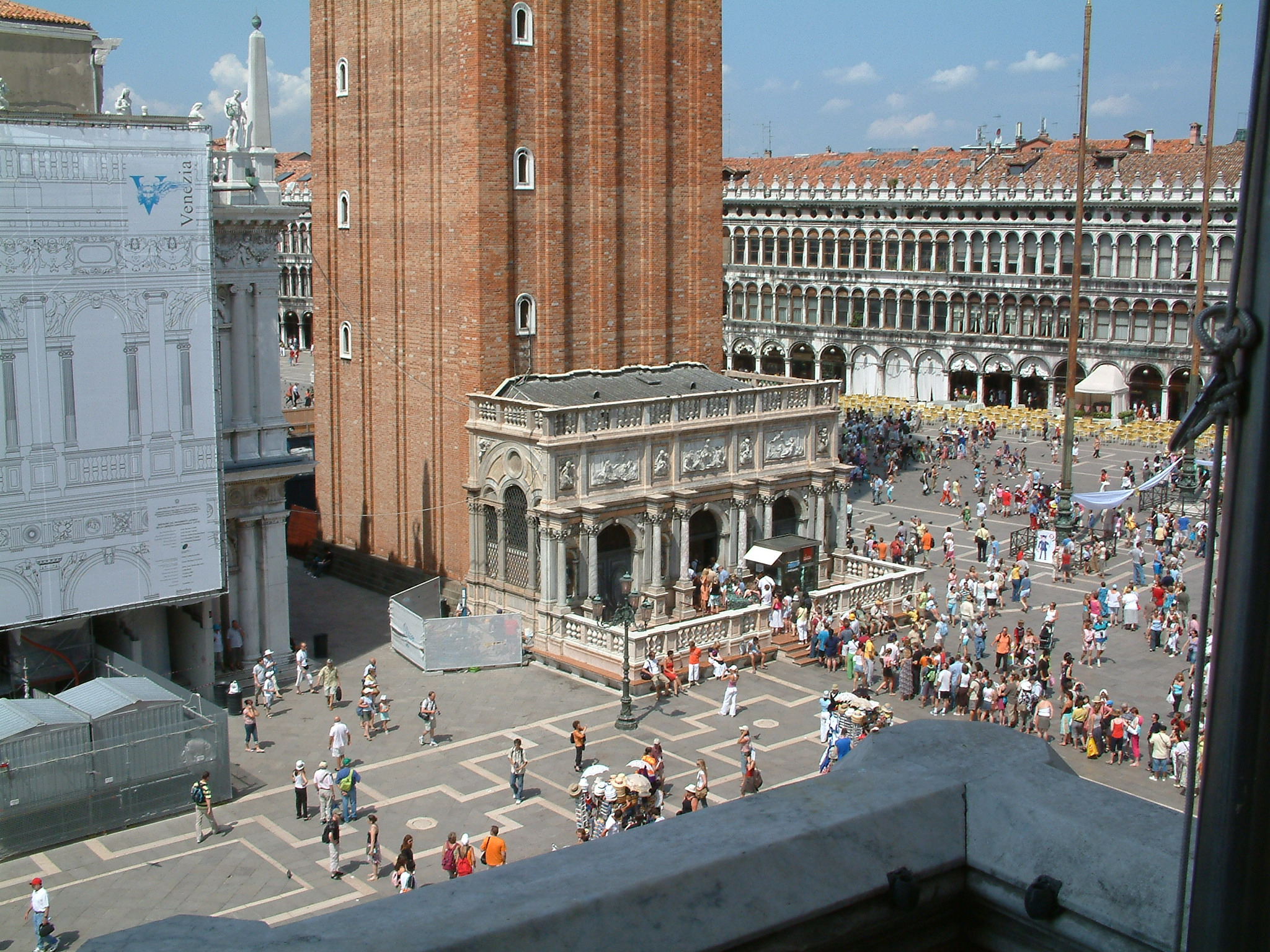
The reconstructed loggetta as seen from the Doge's Palace

In 1902, the loggetta was largely destroyed when the bell tower collapsed. The surviving elements were catalogued and integrated with substitute pieces. The whole was then reassembled in the courtyard of the Doge's Palace before being moved to the base of the new bell tower. Construction was completed in 1912.

The current Loggetta is built with roughly fifty percent of the original architectonic and decorative material. The three surviving columns are located on either side of the doorway and in the second-to-the-last position on the right. Although badly damaged, the reliefs in the attic are original with the exception of the putto on the extreme right. The spandrel figures are also original as are most of the reliefs above and below the niches.

At the time of the reconstruction, the sides that had originally been left in exposed brick were redesigned. The architectural elements of the façade were continued along the sides, and the same types of stone and marble used for the revetments of the main façade were applied to the sides in order to render the entire structure homogeneous.

== Bibliography ==
- Howard, Deborah, Jacopo Sansovino: architecture and patronage in Renaissance Venice (New Haven: Yale University Press, 1975) ISBN 9780300018912
- Howard, Deborah, The Architectural History of Venice (London: B. T. Batsford, 1980) ISBN 9780300090291
- Lotz, Wolfgang, 'The Roman Legacy in Sansovino's Venetian Buildings', Journal of the Society of Architectural Historians, Vol. 22, No. 1 (Mar, 1963), pp. 3–12 ISSN 0037-9808
- Lupo, Giorgio, 'Il restauro ottocentesco della Loggetta sansoviniana in Piazza San Marco a Venezia', ArcHistoR, n. 10, anno V (2018), pp. 129–161
- Morresi, Manuela, Jacopo Sansovino (Milano: Electa, 2000) ISBN 8843575716
- Muir, Edward, Civic Ritual in Renaissance Venice (Princeton: Princeton University Press, 1981) ISBN 0691102007
- Rosand, David, Myths of Venice: the Figuration of a State (Chapel Hill: University of North Carolina Press, 2001) ISBN 0807826413
- Sansovino, Francesco, L'Arte oratoria secondo i modi della lingua volgare (Vinegia: Giovanni Griffio, 1546)
- Sansovino, Francesco, Venetia Città nobilissima et singolare (Venetia: Iacomo Sansovino, 1581)
