= Zecca of Venice =

Coordinates: 45°26′00″N 12°20′21″E

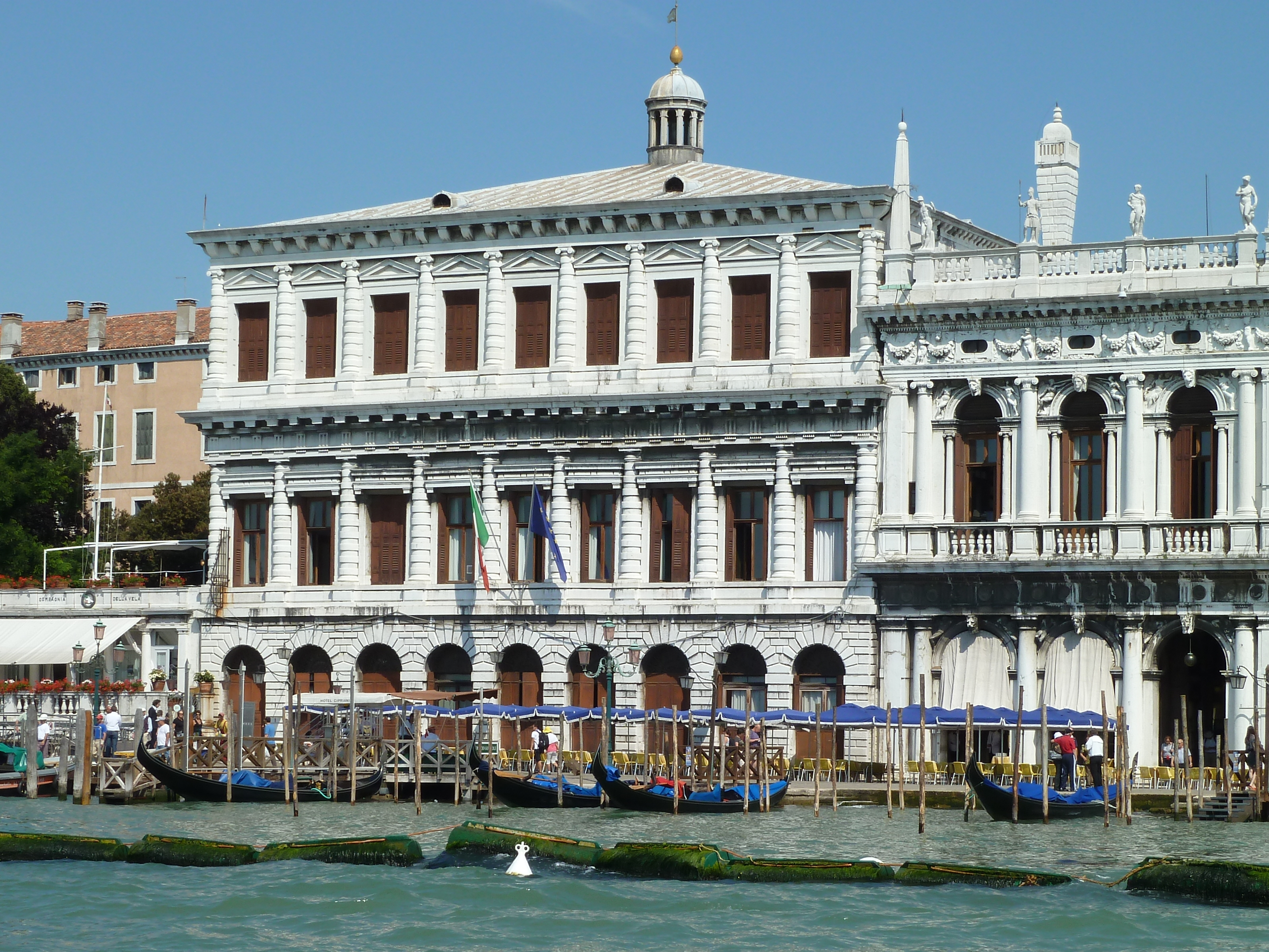
- Main façade
- Location: Venice, Italy

History
- Built: 1536–1548
- Original use: Mint of the Venetian Republic

Site notes
- Architect: Jacopo Sansovino
- Architectural style: High Renaissance
- Current use: Marciana Library

The Zecca (English: Mint) is a sixteenth-century building in Venice, Italy which once housed the mint of the Republic of Venice. Built between 1536 and 1548, the heavily rusticated stone structure, originally with only two floors, was designed by Jacopo Sansovino in place of an earlier mint specifically to ensure safety from fire and to provide adequate security for the silver and gold deposits. Giorgio Vasari considered it the finest, richest, and strongest of Sansovino's buildings ("...bellissimo, ricchissimo, e fortissimo edificio de' suoi è la Zecca di Venezia...").

Coin production continued after the fall of the Republic of Venice in 1797 but ceased in 1852 during the second period of Austrian domination (1814–1866). The building was subsequently adapted and served as the seat for the Chamber of Commerce from 1872 until 1900. Since 1904, it has housed the main part of the Marciana Library whose historical building, next door, is now largely a museum.

== Historical background ==
An earlier mint located in the parish of San Bartolomeo across the Grand Canal from the Rialto market was closed and the parcel of land sold by the government in 1112. (Note: The mint was located along the Canal della Fava between the churches of San Bartolomeo and San Salvatore. See Stahl, Zecca..., p. 8.) The document relative to the sale indicates that the site had been occupied by the mint since 'antiquity', perhaps since the first minting of a local coin, a Carolingian silver penny issued in the name of the emperor Louis the Pious. (Note: The coin resembles issues minted throughout the empire from 819-822 in appearance and weight. See Stahl, Zecca..., pp. 3-4.) Evidence suggests a subsequent cessation of minting in the mid-twelfth century during which time the coinage of Verona seems to have been used for local transactions while Byzantine coins were used for long-distance trade. Local minting resumed when ducal coinage was first issued during the reign of Vitale II Michiel (in office 1156–1172) and increased significantly when the grosso was introduced.

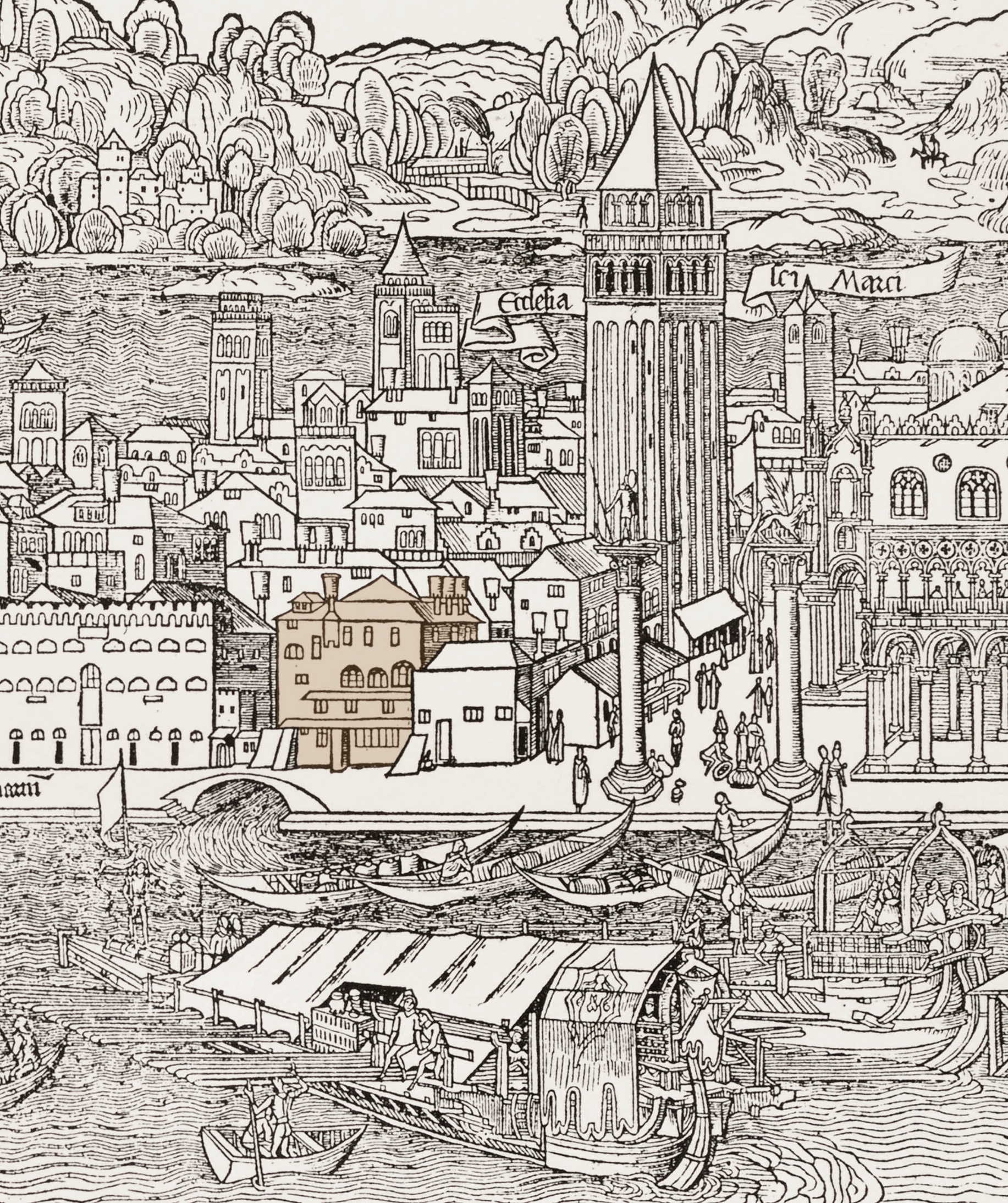
Detail from woodcut Peregrinatio in Terram Sanctam by Erhard Reuwich (1486), showing the earlier mint (shaded) in Saint Mark's Square.

A new silver mint is mentioned as already present in Saint Mark's Square in a resolution of the Great Council in 1278. (Note: The deliberation of the Great Council, dated 8 October, obligated merchants to sell silver either at Rialto or in Saint Mark's Square at the Mint or the moneychangers' booths. See Stahl, Zecca..., p. 281) The location, across the Piazzetta from the Doge's Palace, facilitated oversight by the appropriate magistracy, the Council of Forty, and ensured greater security. It also followed a long-standing tradition in Italy that the mint, as a symbol of fiscal autonomy and economic prosperity, be located near the seat of the government. (Note: In their architectural treatises both Vitruvius and later Filarete recommended that the mint, or treasury, be situated near the centre of government. Elsewhere in Italy, the Vatican mint was built near the entrance to the Apostolic Palace and the Florentine Mint initially opposite the Palazzo della Signoria and subsequently behind the Loggia de' Signori. See Howard, Jacopo Sansovino..., p. 168, note 4.) A separate gold mint, probably adjacent to the existing silver mint, was established in 1285 following the introduction of the ducat. It is referred to in a deliberation of the Great Council, dated that same year, as the Zecca, from the Arabic noun sikka, meaning "die". By 1290, the name was also used for the silver mint, formerly known by the term Moneta.

Over time, these mint facilities were expanded and floors added as demand for coinage increased. (Note: Between 1319 and 1339, both the silver and gold mints were expanded. An additional floor to the gold mint was authorized in 1343 to accommodate four additional hearths, but this was eliminated in 1352. See Stahl, Zecca..., pp. 285-286.) The Reuwich woodcut (Mainz, 1486) and the de' Barbari engraving (Venice, 1500) show the mint as a single, three-story building with a courtyard behind. The structure is delimited on all sides: to the west by a canal, to the north by the tenth-century hospice for pilgrims, to the east by a series of hostelries and the meat market, and to the south by a row of lean-to stalls that were rented by the procurators of Saint Mark de supra to vendors of sausage and cheese.

Safety concerns within the mint were raised when fire broke out in July 1532. Following an inspection by Doge Andrea Gritti (in office 1523–1538) to verify conditions, the Council of Ten, the magistracy responsible for the defence of vital state interests, deliberated on 4 December 1535 that the entire mint was to be rebuilt with stone vaults in order to eliminate the use of wooden beams. This decision coincided with a need to add furnaces and increase production following a deliberation of the Council of Ten in 1526 that obligated the government offices dislocated in the subject cities on the mainland to accept only Venetian currency, effectively substituting local currencies for official business. In addition, it was necessary to improve security when after 1528 interest-earning private deposits began to be accepted at the mint as a means of increasing the supply of silver for minting.

For the design of the new mint, three projects were reviewed, and on 28 March 1536, the Council of Ten awarded the commission to Jacopo Sansovino. The architect, as proto (consultant architect and buildings manager) of the procurators of Saint Mark de supra, had already supervised the final stages in the construction of the Procuratie vecchie in Saint Mark's Square following the death of his predecessor Pietro Bon, (Note: Pietro Bon, chief consulting architect for the procurators of Saint Mark de supra is often confused with Bartolomeo Bon, chief consulting architect for the Salt Office. For relative documentation and the attribution of various projects, see Stefano Mariani, 'Vita e opere dei proti Bon Bartolomeo e Pietro' (unpublished doctoral thesis, Istituto Universitario di Architettura – Venezia, Dipartimento di Storia dell'Architettura, 1983).) but the mint was his first major commission in Venice.

== Building ==
=== Construction ===
==== 1536-1548 ====
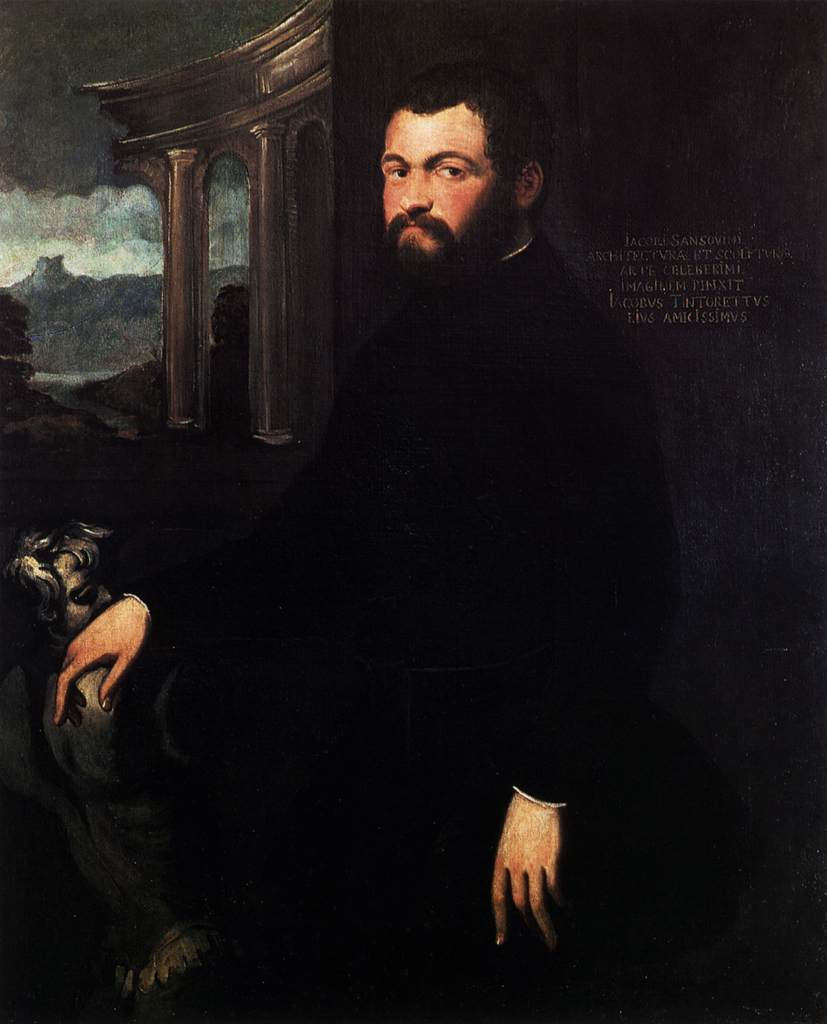
Tintoretto, Portrait of Jacopo Sansovino (before 1546), Florence, Galleria degli Uffizi. The architect also served as consultant architect for the construction of the Zecca to draw up contracts and to resolve all design-related matters.

Saint Mark's Square

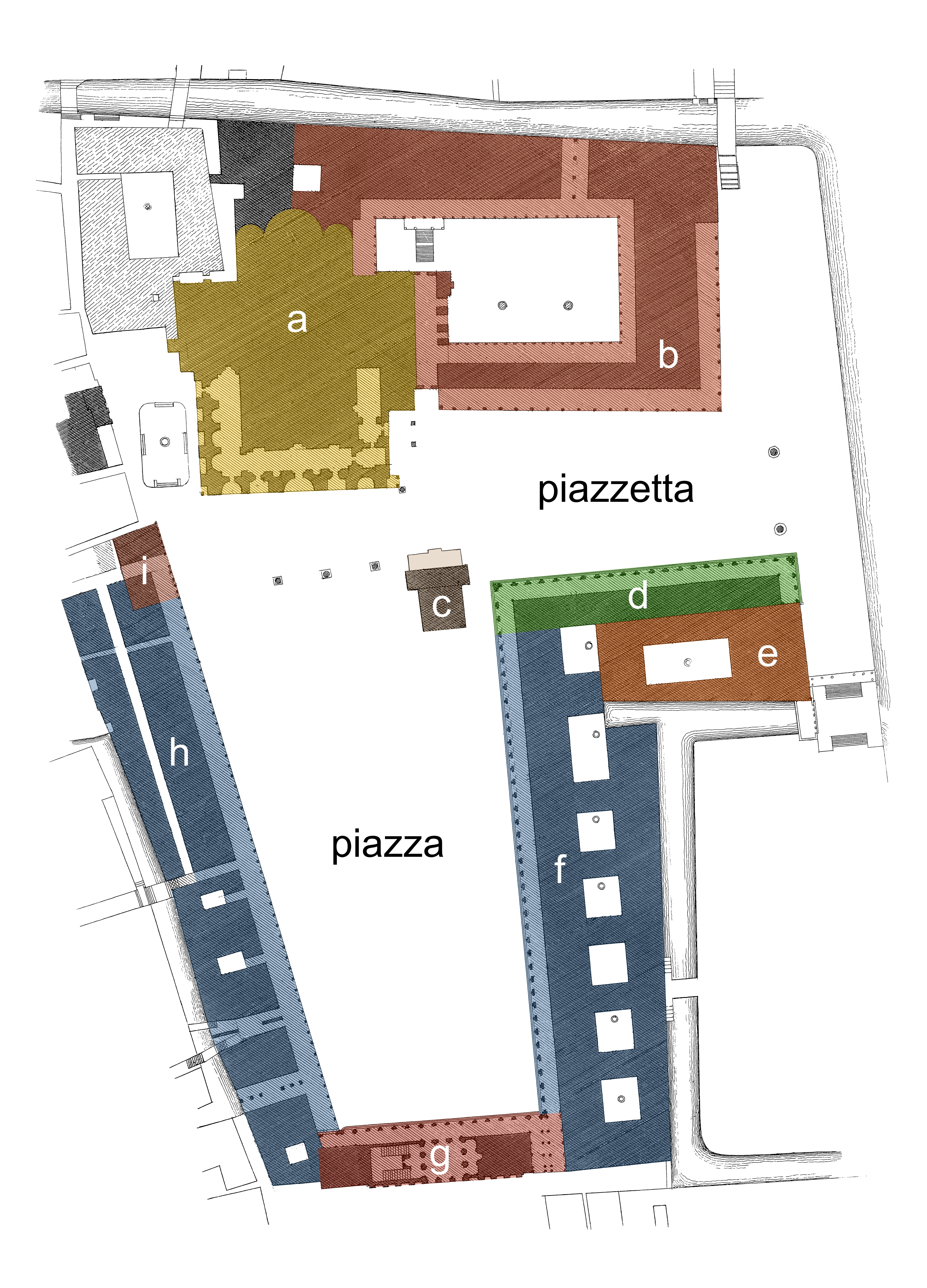
a. St Mark's Basilica
b. Ducal Palace
c. Bell tower and Loggetta
d. Marciana Library
e. Mint
f. Procuratie Nuove
g. Napoleonic wing
h. Procuratie Vecchie
i. Clock tower

Independently of the need to provide greater fire protection and security as well as space for increased production, the mint was intended to symbolize Venice's financial recovery from years of famine and war. (Note: The second Italian war (1499-1504) largely coincided with the conflict against the Ottomans (1499-1503). The third Italian war lasted from 1508-1516. Conflicts on the mainland began anew in 1521 with the fourth and fifth Italian wars and concluded in 1530. Famine struck in 1527-1528.) It was an integral part of the renovatio urbis, the vast architectural programme begun under Doge Andrea Gritti to express Venice's renewed self-confidence and reaffirm its international prestige after the earlier defeat at Agnadello during the War of Cambrai and the subsequent Peace of Bologna which sanctioned Habsburg hegemony on the Italian Peninsula at the end of the War of the League of Cognac. The programme, which included the library (1537) and the loggia of the bell tower (1538), called for the transformation of Saint Mark’s Square from an antiquated medieval town centre with food vendors, money changers, and even latrines into a classical forum. The intent was to evoke the memory of the ancient Roman republic and, in the aftermath of the Sack of Rome in 1527, to present Venice as Rome’s true successor. Sansovino's understanding of Vitruvian principles and his direct knowledge of ancient Roman prototypes, garnered from his time in Rome, provided the expertise necessary to enact the programme.

To raise the 5,000 ducats appropriated for construction, the Council of Ten authorized the freeing of slaves on Cyprus, then a Venetian possession, at 50 ducats a head. (Note: An estimated 23,000 to 24,000 slaves existed on Cyprus. These were descendants of the earlier invaders who had later been enslaved by the Byzantines. For a discussion, see Federico Berchet, 'Contributo alla storia dell'edificio della veneta Zecca, prima della sua destinazione a sede della Biblioteca Nazionale Marciana', Atti del Regio Istituto Veneto di Scienze, Lettere ed Arti, lxix (1909-1910), part II, pp. 339-367.) Additional funds were similarly raised in 1539 and 1544. Ultimately, the construction of the mint exceeded initial cost estimates roughly sixfold. (Note: By 1558, 28,879 ducats had been spent to complete Sansovino's design. Additional funds in the amount of 1,790 ducats arrived later and were used to finance the additional floor. See Howard, Jacopo Sansovino..., pp. 42 and 169, note 31.)

Construction began in 1536 and, given the importance of the mint, does not seem to have been hindered by the financial constraints at the time of the Ottoman–Venetian War (1537–1540). (Note: Contracts were already awarded in January 1537 (=Venetian year 1536) for the vaults of a portion of the ground floor, an indication that work had progressed sufficiently. See Howard, Jacopo Sansovino..., p. 169, note 13.) Since minting operations could not be interrupted, work had to proceed piecemeal, beginning with the charcoal depository on the northern side. To protect the structure from high tides, the floor level was raised by approximately 1 m (3.3 ft). In 1539, it was decided to incorporate the lean-to cheese and sausage shops along the embankment into the new structure in order to give greater dignity to the mint façade but also to then extend the upper floor over the shops and provide additional space for the gold mint which was located upstairs. But for security concerns, the shops were relocated in 1588. The arcades on the ground floor, originally open to facilitate commercial activities, were walled, and the space was annexed to the mint. Construction terminated in 1548. (Note: Sansovino received a final payment on 17 May 1549. See Morresi, Jacopo Sansovino, p. 184.)

==== 1558 addition ====
Sansovino's original building had only two floors with a low attic above, lit by small rectangular windows. But the attic became unusable during the summer months due to the combined heat of the sun on the leaden roof above and the furnaces below. In 1558, the Council of Ten consequently authorized the construction of an additional floor to be paid for with the remaining funds. Although Sansovino was likely consulted for technical and structural aspects, it is improbable that he in fact designed the uppermost floor. (Note: The decision to add another floor to the mint coincided with a legal dispute between Sansovino's regular employers, the procurators of Saint Mark de supra, and the mint officials, the provveditori in Zecca, regarding the rightful recipient of the rental income from the sausage and cheese shops that had been incorporated into the mint. In 1554, the Provveditori ordered the tenets to pay the rent to the mint rather than to the procurators as in the past. In the resulting case, the provveditori objected to Sansovino's testimony on the grounds that he was an employee of the procurators and therefore biased. In such tense circumstances, it is unlikely that they would have awarded him the contract for the new floor of the mint. See Howard, Jacopo Sansovino..., p. 42, Morresi, Jacopo Sansovino, p. 184, and Tafuri, Jacopo Sansovino..., p. 72, note 89.)

=== Architecture ===
==== Layout ====
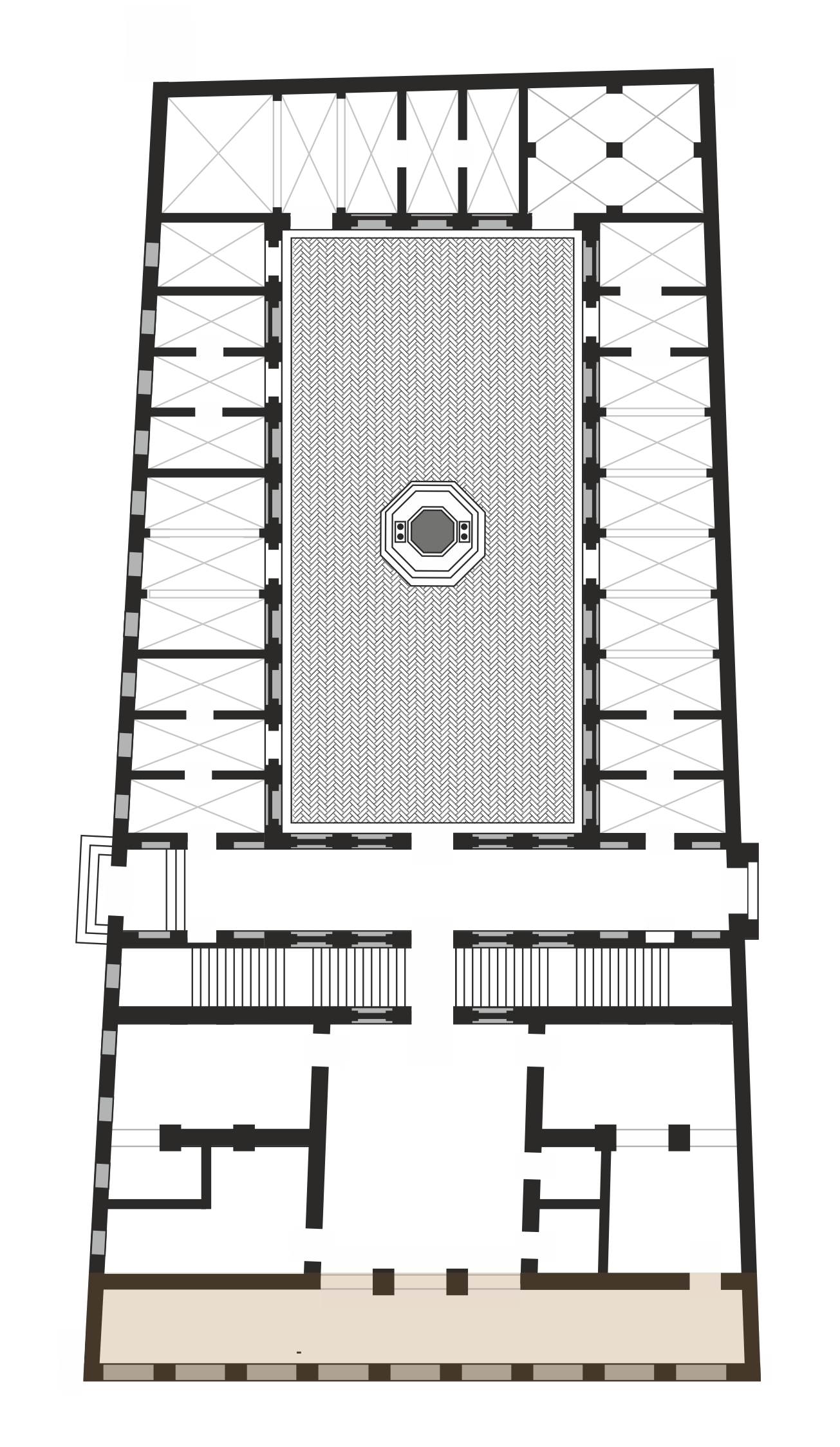
Layout of the ground floor with shaded area indicating location of sausage and cheese shops (relocated in 1588)

Due to the need to ensure ongoing minting operations during construction, the basic layout of the earlier mint was most likely maintained, activities being momentarily relocated as new sections were built. The area on the ground floor facing the lagoon, separated from the rest of the building by a staircase and a long corridor connecting the water entry along the canal and the land entry onto the Piazzetta, was occupied by the offices of the silver officials and by the furnaces for the smelting and casting of silver. In the rear section, twenty workshops for the production of silver coins were located along the sides of a rectangular courtyard. Sansovino designed these workshops as small spaces so that the closely placed walls would provide adequate support for the heavy stone vaults. Charcoal deposits were located on the far side of the courtyard. A cistern for the collection of rain water was built under the pavement, the water being accessed through a wellhead with a statue of Apollo that was commissioned of Danese Cattaneo.The upper floor, destined for the minting of gold coins, was similarly arranged but with larger, and hence fewer, workshops.

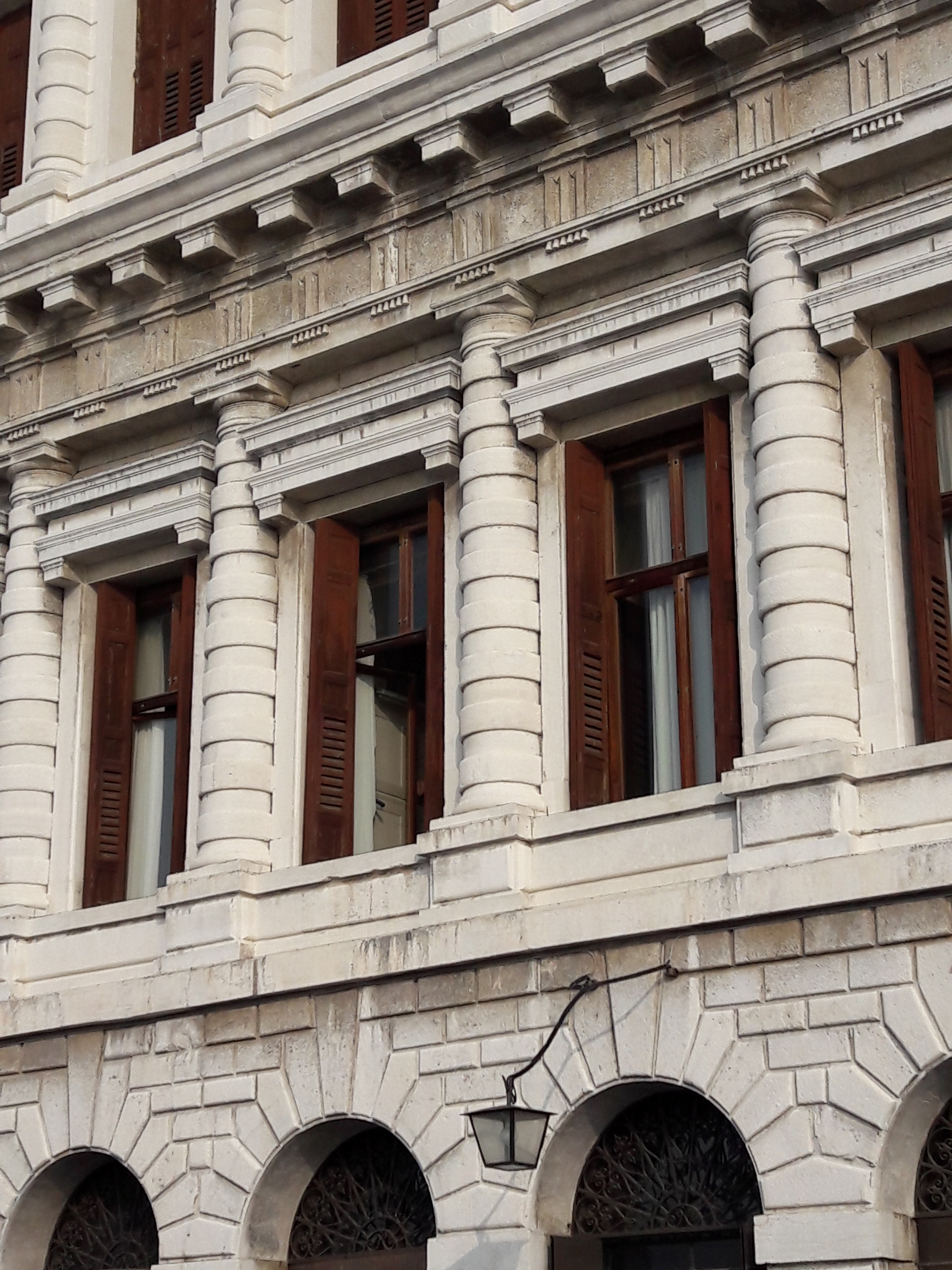
Detail of façade showing rustication of Doric order

==== Façade ====
To convey a sense of impregnability appropriate to the function of the mint, Sansovino employed for the ground floor heavy rustication which was extended over the Doric order on the floor above. In Venice, such a combination of heavy-cut Istrian limestone and classical orders had already been used by Mauro Codussi for San Michele in Isola (begun 1469) and, in a more muted form, for Palazzo Corner Spinelli (1497–1500). However, it is likely that Sansovino was inspired by the ancient Porta Maggiore built under Claudius (52) and by Giulio Romano's designs for the portal at Villa Madama (1519) as well as for his own residence at Macel de' Corvi (1523–1524, demolished 1902) with which Sansovino would have been familiar from his second period in Rome (1516–1527). Significantly, Sebastiano Serlio, in his seven-volume architectural treatise Tutte l'opere d'architettura et prospetiva, considered the solution of clean-cut capitals and bases with crude, rusticated columns to represent great strength and to be appropriate to a fortress.

The windows on the Doric level, originally protected by heavy iron grilles, are fit tightly between the engaged columns with no exposed surface, creating the impression that they are deeply recessed in a thick wall and contributing further to the sense of impregnability. The effect is enhanced by the massive, protruding lintels above. The floor that was later added employs the Ionic order, and although it continues the rustication, the exposed walls around the windows and the delicate tympanums overhead, more typical of residential architecture, contrast with the design of the original structure and diminish the overall massive feel.

==== Entry ====
The heavily rusticated entry portal, flanked by two telamons supporting a Doric entablature, was subsequently incorporated into the seventeenth arcade of the library. (Note: Giulio Lorenzetti erroneously ascribes the design of the entry to Vincenzo Scamozzi, Sansovino's pupil, in Itinerario sansoviniano in Venezia (1929), but as the entry is already mentioned by Francesco Sansovino in Tutte le cose notabili che sono in Venetia (1556), prior to Scamozzi's superintendence of the library, it should be ascribed to Sansovino. See Morresi, Jacopo Sansovino, p. 184.) In the resulting passageway, two colossal statues, carved by Girolamo Campagna and Tiziano Aspetti, were placed.

== Mint staff and officials ==
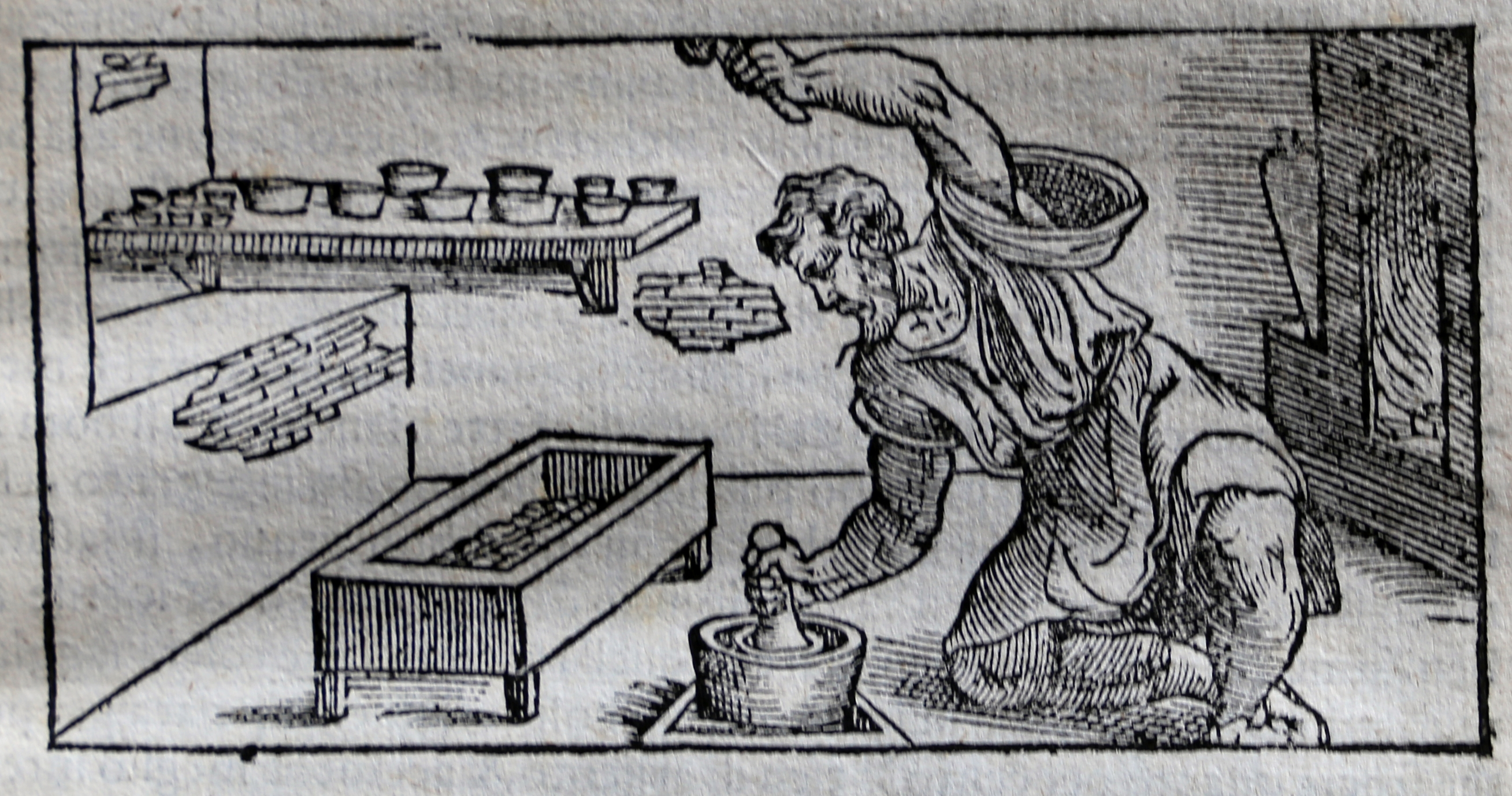

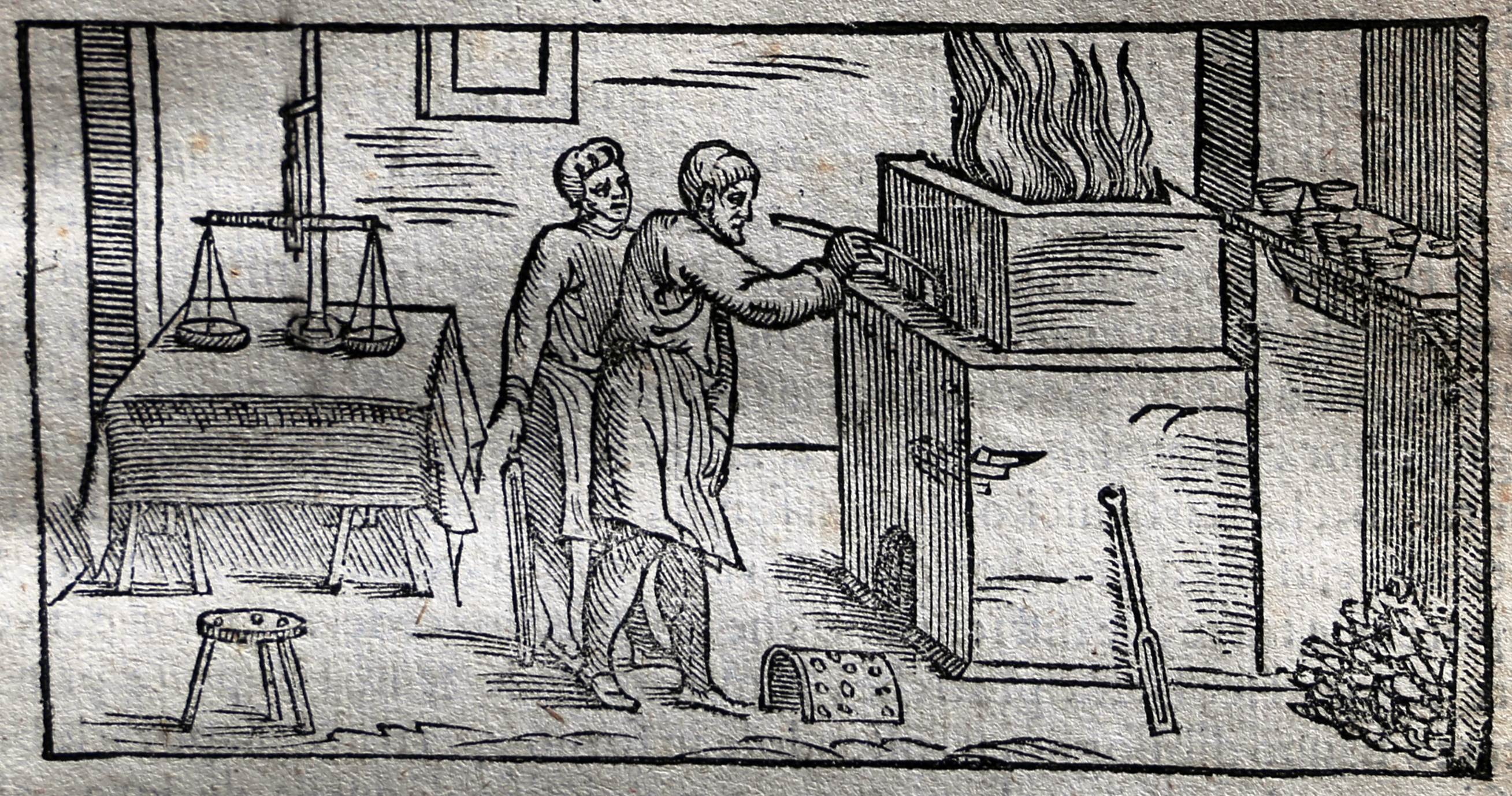
Illustrations of the cupellation process used to separate silver from base metals.
Source: Biringuccio, Vannoccio, De la pirotechnia, 1550, Vinegia, Giovan Padoano, cc. 45r and 47r.

=== Production ===
Minting activity fluctuated throughout the year according to the availability of bullion and the commercial needs of the merchants but was most intense in spring and early summer when, after the snow in the Alps had melted, German merchants brought silver and gold to the city and the departing merchant-galley fleets required large amounts of coinage for trade in the East.

The number of employees consequently varied, but in addition to the salaried gastaldi (foremen), fabri (blacksmiths who forged dies), intaidori (die engravers), pexadori (weighers), and fanti (unskilled workers with menial tasks), the staff routinely included skilled labourers paid at a piecework rate: afinadori (refiners), fondadori (casters who cast blank flans), mendadori (emenders who controlled the prescribed weight tolerances), and stampadori (moneyers who struck coins) for both the silver mint (lower floor) and the gold mint (upper floor). (Note: See Stahl, Zecca..., pp.320-353 for a description of mint operations.) Estimates for the medieval mint place the workforce at around 225 individuals, making the mint the second largest single employer after the Arsenal, the government-operated shipyards.

- Massari alla moneta e Massari all'oro e all'argento

The technical operations were coordinated by the Massari alla moneta e Massari all'argento e all'oro (mintmasters, separate for silver and gold). Usually of noble status, the Massari were responsible for acquiring bullion, supervising manufacture, and distributing newly minted coins. (Note: For the duties of the mintmasters, see Stahl, Zecca..., pp. 245-255. See also Milan and others, Guida alle magistrature..., p. 114.)

=== Oversight ===
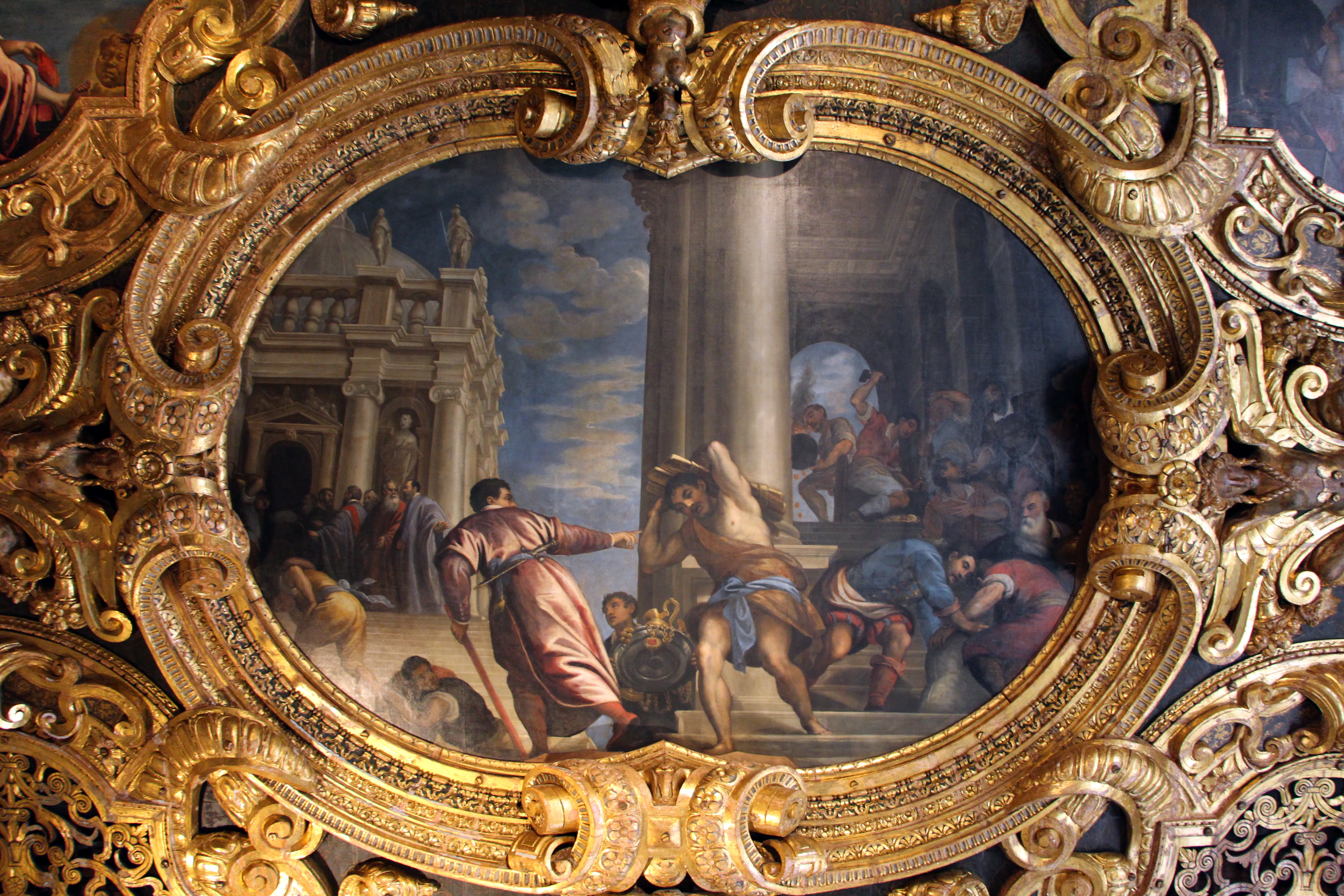
Painting of a Provveditore in Zecca escorting bullion to the Zecca by Marco Vecellio (Senate Hall, Doge's Palace)

In addition, several magistracies existed to provide oversight:

- Provveditori in Zecca

The Council of Ten was ultimately responsible for the control of the mint in consideration of its vital interest for the security of the state. But beginning in 1522, supervisory functions were assigned to a magistrate, chosen from among the Council membership, with the title of Provveditore in Zecca. Initially charged with the acquiring and minting of gold and the refining of silver, the Provveditore quickly assumed responsibility for the general direction of the mint. In addition, the Provveditore was responsible for dispensing government funds that were deposited in the mint to the subject cities and to the army. In 1562, the number of members of the Magistracy was increased to two and in 1572 a third was added. Following the reform of the Council of Ten in 1582, the magistracy came under the jurisdiction of the Senate.

- Depositario

Created in 1543 by the Council of the Ten, the Depositario was responsible for the mint’s cash accounts. The Depositario also maintained accounts for private capital deposited in the mint and ensured that the funds were not misappropriated by the government.

- Provveditori a ori e monete

The Provveditori a ori e monete were created in 1551 to ensure that gold, whether coined or not, was not sold at a price other than the official rate fixed by the government.

- Provveditori sopra ori e argenti

Created in 1585, the Provveditori sopra ori e argenti intervened in cases of money exchanged at other than face value.

- Conservatore dei pubblici depositi

The office of the Conservatore dei pubblici depositi was made permanent in 1592 with the responsibility for the reserve funds of the state that were kept in the mint.

- Provveditore alli prò

Instituted in 1639, the Provveditore alli prò oversaw the payment of interest on the private funds deposited in the mint.

== Later adaptations ==
=== Chamber of Commerce ===
Minting operations continued after the fall of the Venetian Republic in 1797 but ceased in 1852 during the second period of Austrian rule (1814–1866). In 1872, the Chamber of Commerce rented the building, signing a twenty-nine-year lease. To prepare the building for its new function and accommodate the offices, an extensive renovation was carried out from 1870 to 1872. This involved inserting windows into the ground-floor arcades in the courtyard. On the façade, the iron grilles of the windows on the upper two stories were removed. The result with regard to the first-floor windows was highly criticized by the art historian Camillo Boito who noted that the heavy protruding lintels had been conceived with the iron grilles underneath as a unified whole in order to give the façade a sense of strength and impenetrability. Without the accompanying ironwork as a visual support, the lintels appeared precariously balanced, and the windows were an "awkward eyesore, devoid of any common sense" ("una bruttura goffa e priva di senso comune"). Boito was equally critical of the modifications made to move the principal entry for the public to the main façade along the waterfront. Of the nine blind arcades, designed as a series, the central three were opened to create a visual focal point and mark the entry. But no corresponding focal point existed on the upper floors, and as a result the building lost its sense of unity. The original aspect of the façade was reestablished when the remaining arcades were opened in 1892.

=== Marciana Library ===
In 1900, after the Chamber of Commerce declared its willingness to vacate the building prior to the expiration of the lease, the Italian government made the decision to utilize the structure for the Marciana Library. At that time, the collection of codices and books was housed in the former Hall of the Great Council in the Doge's Palace, having been moved there from the library’s historical building in 1811. The palace, however, was ill-suited for the needs of the library. The space was insufficient, and the collection was inconveniently scattered in various rooms and corridors, with a heightened risk of theft. Visitors who toured the palace routinely disturbed readers, who were confined to a small, poorly lit room. Most importantly, the collection had grown from around 50,000 volumes in 1811 to around 400,000, and the weight of the books threatened the palace's structural integrity: in 1897, several of the rooms had to be reinforced and damage repaired. The following year a commission of three architects inspected the building and concluded that they could not ensure its future stability.

Over time, various alternative locations were considered, including the former monastery of San Zaccaria, Ca' Corner, and Ca' Rezzonico. The proposal to use the Zecca was first made by the librarian Carlo Castallani in 1885 and gained the support of the mayor of Venice, Filippo Grimani, and the Venetian senator and historian Pompeo Molmenti who intervened with the government. The architectural project to adapt the building was developed by the local office of the Ministry of Public Works, advised by the library administration.

Given the urgent need to remove the collection from the palace, work proceeded rapidly. The divisions erected by the Chamber of Commerce to create individual offices were removed in order to have large, open-bay repositories for books. The reading room for printed books was created in the courtyard by roofing the space with a skylight in timber and glass and installing heating. The wellhead was removed and the original pavement covered with flooring. (Note: The wellhead is now located in the courtyard of Ca' Pesaro.) New furnishings, walnut tables and chairs, were ordered. The reading room for manuscripts was set up in the area originally occupied by the silver furnaces. For this, bookcases were brought from the palace and modified to fit the new spaces. Other bookcases were modified for the room on the first floor where the manuscripts were to be kept. The collection was transferred between 12 August and 18 September 1904, and the library was opened to the public on 19 December 1904. Before the official inauguration on 27 April 1905, the vaults were painted with themes that record the history of the library.

== Bibliography ==
- Boito, Camillo, Questioni pratiche di belle arti: restauri, concorsi, legislazione, professione, insegnamento (Milano: Ulrico Hoepli, 1893)
- Cappelletti, Giuseppe, Storia delle magistrature venete (Venezia: Grimaldo, 1873)
- Chambers, David, The Imperial Age of Venice 1380-1580 (London: Thames and Hudson, 1970) ISBN 0155408917
- Clark, J. W., 'On the Library of S. Mark, Venice', Proceedings of the Cambridge Antiquarian Society, LX (24 April – 29 May 1911), 300–314
- Howard, Deborah, The Architectural History of Venice (London: B. T. Batsford, 1980) ISBN 9780300090291
- Howard, Deborah, Jacopo Sansovino: architecture and patronage in Renaissance Venice (New Haven: Yale University Press, 1975) ISBN 9780300018912
- Milan, Catia, Antonio Politi, and Bruno Vianello, Guida alle magistrature: elementi per la conoscenza della Repubblica veneta (Sommacampagna: Cierre, 2003) ISBN 8883142047
- Morresi, Manuela, Jacopo Sansovino (Milano: Electa, 2000) ISBN 8843575716
- Sandri, Domenico and others, Le potenzialità trasformative di un luogo: la Zecca ora Biblioteca Marciana (Venezia: Cluva, 1989) ISBN 8885067670
- Sanudo, Marin, Diari, ed. by G. Berchet, N. Barozzi, and M. Allegri, 58 vols (Venezia: [n. pub.], 1879–1903)
- Serlio, Sebastiano, Regole generali di architetura sopra le cinque maniere de gliedifici (Venetia: Francesco Marcolini, 1537)
- Stahl, Alan M., Zecca, the Mint of Venice in the Middle Ages (Baltimore: Johns Hopkins University Press, 2000) ISBN 978-0801863837
- Tafuri, Manfredo, Jacopo Sansovino e l'architettura del '500 a Venezia (Padova: Marsilio, 1969)
- Tafuri, Manfredo, Renovatio urbis: Venezia nell'età di Andrea Gritti (1523-1538) (Roma: Officina, 1984)
- Vasari, Giorgio, Le vite de' più eccellenti pittori, scultori ed architettori, 9 vols (Firenze: G. C. Sansoni, 1878–1885)
- Zorzi, Marino, La libreria di san Marco: libri, lettori, società nella Venezia dei dogi (Milano: Mondadori, 1987) ISBN 8804306866
