= View of Venice =

Woodcut print showing a bird's-eye view of the city of Venice, Italy

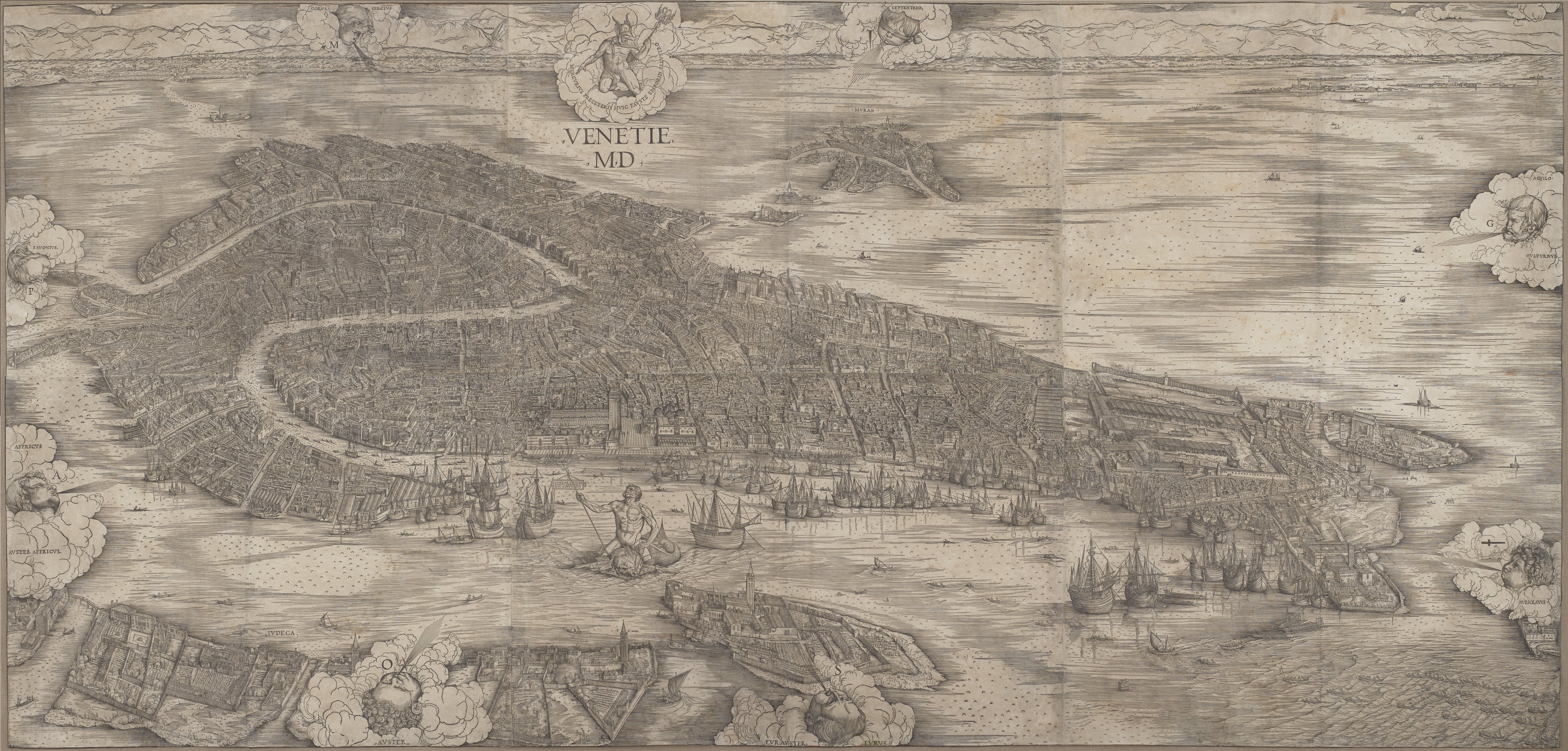
View of Venice, first state, 1500, Minneapolis Institute of Art

View of Venice, also known as the de' Barbari Map, is a monumental woodcut print showing a bird's-eye view of the city of Venice from the southwest. It bears the title and date "VENETIE MD" ("Venice 1500"). It was printed from six wooden blocks designed from 1498 to 1500 by Jacopo de' Barbari, and then published in late 1500 by the Nuremberg publisher Anton Kolb on six large sheets of paper, each measuring about 66 cm × 99 cm (26 in × 39 in), to create a composite image measuring approximately 135 cm × 280 cm (53 in × 110 in). The individual sheets of paper were the largest produced in Europe up to that time.

The finished work has an approximate scale of 1:1,250 (east-west) and 1:2,750 (north-south) and was probably intended for display on a wall. Examples of the three states of the print are held by public collections. The six large wooden printing blocks would have been carved by professional cutters, following preparatory drawings made by Jacopo de' Barbari. The six original blocks, which were made from pear wood, now with splits and damage from woodworm, are in the Museo Correr in Venice.

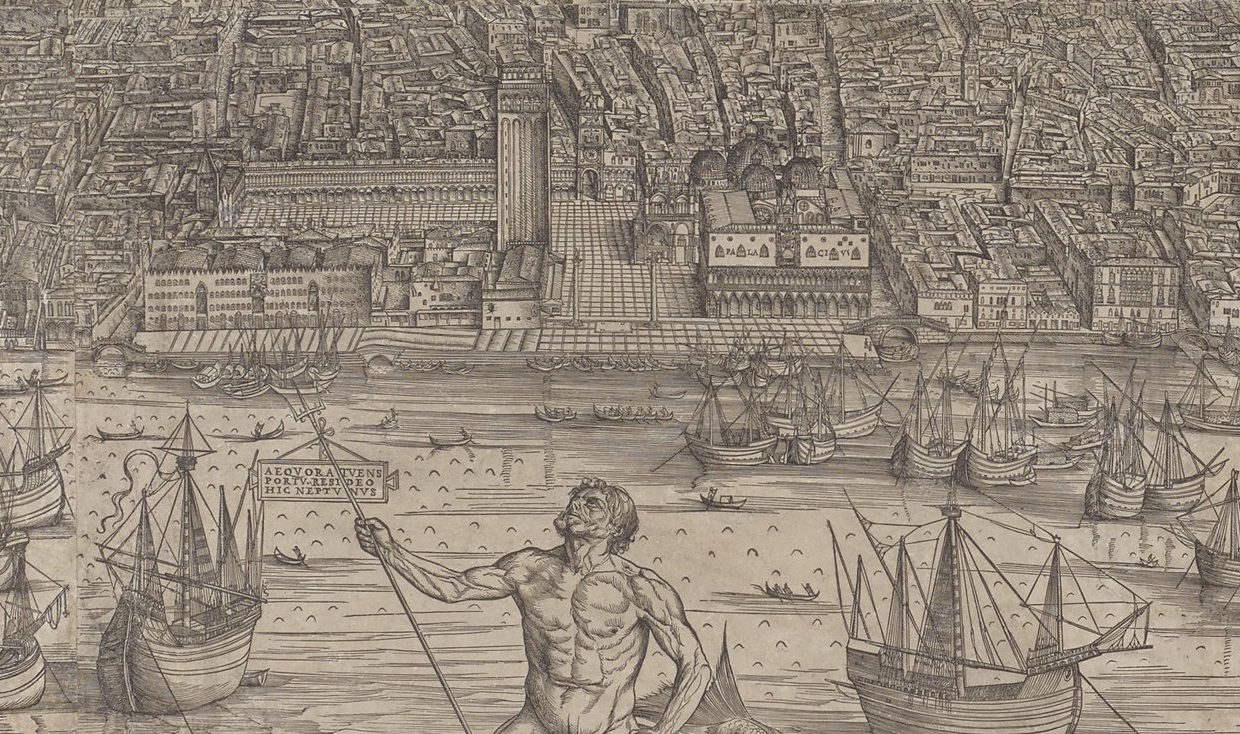
Detail of the Piazza San Marco and surrounding area, from the first state of the print, at the Minneapolis Institute of Art

The print is one of the first large bird's-eye cityscape views, and may have been inspired by views of Florence by Francesco Rosselli from the 1480s. It may be the earliest surviving comprehensive view of Venice: earlier views by Leon Battista Alberti and Jacopo Bellini are believed to be lost. The British Library quotes an article by art historian Martin Kemp in 1991 in which he says it is "an achievement of astonishing visual and intellectual control".

== Description ==
The print shows Venice and the surrounding islands in the Venetian lagoon, including Burano, Giudecca, Mazzorbo, Murano, and Torcello. The Alps to the north line the horizon along the top edge. The names of some locations and buildings are printed. The print shows the location of Venetian churches and other buildings, including 103 bell towers.

The city is depicted in a realistic form, like a topographical landscape view, with large or important buildings generally depicted on the same scale as smaller or less important ones. The buildings and street plan are simplified in some areas, and the heights of many buildings are exaggerated, to make towers taller than they should be in proportion to their length or width: so for example the Doge's Palace is depicted about 50% taller than compared to its width.

The apparent accuracy of the print has led some commentators to suggest that it may be based on a ground survey, perhaps with observations from the city's bell towers, but the analysis of Juergen Schulz in 1978 suggests this is not entirely correct. Rather, according to Schulz, de' Barbari seems to have started his drawing on the right side (east), perhaps based on plans used for maintenance of the city's waterways, and progressively compressed and distorted the scale as he ran out of space moving towards the left (west) edge. However Deborah Howard has suggested as the production of the work had taken three years and had been so expensive that the distortion was not an accident, and that the layout of the city in the woodcut was deliberately distorted for the iconographic purpose of making the shape of Venice resemble a dolphin, with its rounded head to the left and tail to the right. Howard notes the continued dolphin-like representation of the city's outline in maps made as late as the 19th century, echoing de' Barbari's print.

== Winds and deities ==
The winds of the Mediterranean

Around the edge are eight personifications of winds, two on each side, labelled with the names of the twelve classical compass winds or Anemoi: clockwise from the top, Septentrio (T), Aquilo and Fulturnus (G), Subsolanus (cross), Eurus and Eurauster (S), Auster (O), Auster Affricus and Affricus (A), Favonius (P), Corus and Circius (M). The letters refer to the traditional labels of the compass rose: Tramontana to the north, Greco to the northeast, Levante to the east, Sirocco to the southeast, Ostro to the south, Affricus to the southwest, Ponente to the west, and Maestro (Mistral) to the northwest. The positions of each wind are more determined more by artistic considerations than the true orientation of the city in the image.

At the top of the print is a depiction of Mercury, the Roman god of commerce, with the inscription "MERCVRIVS PRECETERIS HVIC FAVSTE EMPORIIS ILLVSTRO" (Latin: "I Mercury shine favourably on this above all other emporia". Neptune, Roman god of the seas, with a trident, rides a dolphin in the harbour, accompanied by an inscription reading "AEQVORA TVENS PORTV RESIDEO HIC NEPTVNVS" (Latin: "I Neptune reside here smoothing the harbour waters"). The Latin title, "VENETI[A]E" is given in the locative case, specifically locating the image with the gods "At Venice" or "In Venice". The two gods are slightly offset from the centre of the composite print to lie either side of and emphasise the important area from the Rialto to the Piazza San Marco.

== Authorship and Publication ==
On 30 October 1500, the Signoria of Venice gave the publisher Anton Kolb an exemption from duties on the export of the print, and also the exclusive right to reproduce the print for the next four years. The publication of the print in October 1500 was independently mentioned in the contemporaneous diary of the Venetian writer Marino Sanuto the Younger.

In his application to the Signoria, Kolb had stated that the print took three years to prepare, but he did not name the artist. Because of its high quality the print was traditionally attributed to Albrecht Dürer, but that attribution was doubted from the 18th century. Today it is confidently attributed to the Venetian painter and printmaker Jacopo de' Barbari, whose details recall German masters. He marks his works with the caduceus, in this case carried by the figure of Mercury at the top. Until his paintings were identified, his works were attributed to the notname "Master of the Caduceus". The windgods resemble the faces of his engravings. The attribution relies on stylistic and technical resemblances further as well as on the documented association with Kolb after the publication. Between 1500 and 1504 they were employed by Maximilian I, Holy Roman Emperor.

Jacopo's print is an accomplished High Renaissance work with detailed components compared to Rosselli's Florence print.

== Prints ==
To recoup the costs the prints had to be sold at least for three ducats, a considerable sum, similar to the monthly wage of a master painter. Examples soon entered the collections of wealthy collectors from church and state, who may have sufficient wall space to display the assembled composite print as intended, pasted on a linen support or directly onto the wall.

Three states of the print are known, with the second state in two variants. Around a dozen (different sources say 11, 12 or 13) impressions of the first state of the woodcut are known, and a similar number of the other two states. The unusually large number of surviving prints suggests that the work was treated as a valuable work of art, rather than a working topographical image. The first state published in 1500 shows St Mark's Campanile with a temporary flat roof after it was struck by lightning and caught fire in 1489. The second state was published c. 1514; it was altered to show the Campanile as restored in 1511–4 after it was damaged by an earthquake in 1511, and the original date (MD - 1500) was removed: one variant leaves a blank space where the date was in the first state, and another fills the space with horizontal hatching. The third state was published later in the 16th century, adding back the date (MD), and with the Campanile altered again to show a much cruder version of the flat-roofed depiction in the first state (but forgetting to remove the angel-shaped weather vane added on top of the tower in the adjacent sheet).

== Locations ==
Examples of the first state are held by several public collections. Terisio Pignatti listed the locations of known prints in 1964, and several more have come to light since then.

- State I
  - Hamburg, Kunsthalle (from Harzen, 1689)
  - Boston, Museum of Fine Arts (from Kraus, 1955, gift of Professor W. A. Roese)
  - Cleveland Museum of Art (since 1949, from the Liechtenstein collection)
  - London, British Museum (donated by William Mitchell in 1895)
  - Nuremberg, Germanisches Nationalmuseum
  - Paris, Bibliothèque Nationale de France
  - Venice, Fondazione Querini Stampalia
  - Venice, Museo Correr (three copies)
  - Venice, Museo Storico Navale
  - Berlin, Kupferstichkabinett Berlin, Staatliche Museen zu Berlin
  - Minneapolis Institute of Art (acquired in 2010 from the descendants of André Masséna)
- State II
  - London, British Museum (Colnaghi, 1860)
  - Venice, Biblioteca Marciana
  - Venice, Museo Correr
  - Vienna, Albertina (from the Imperial Library)
  - Washington DC, National Gallery of Art (since 1950, from the collection of Lessing J. Rosenwald, from the Liechtenstein collection)
  - Los Angeles, Graphic Arts Foundation, UCLA (state IIA)
  - Rijksprentenkabinet, Rijksmuseum, Amsterdam (state IIB)
  - University of Texas, Austin, Texas (state IIB)
- State III
  - Florence, private collection
  - Venice, Museo Correr
  - Venice, private collection
  - Vienna, Albertina

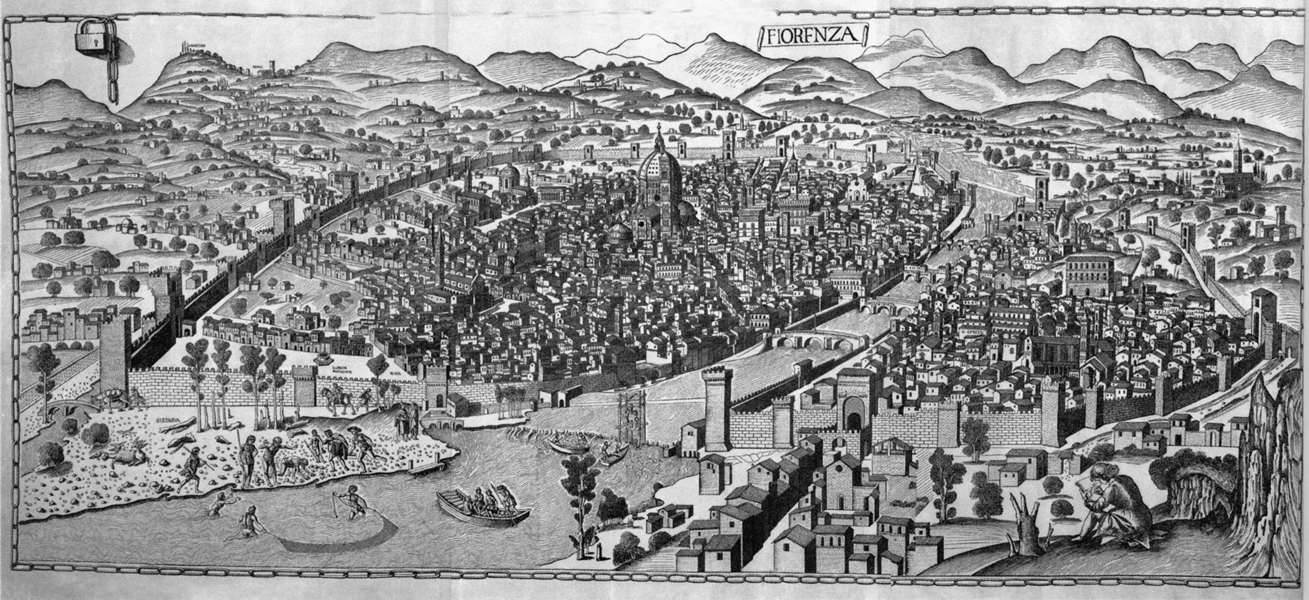
View of Florence by Francesco Rosselli, 1480s

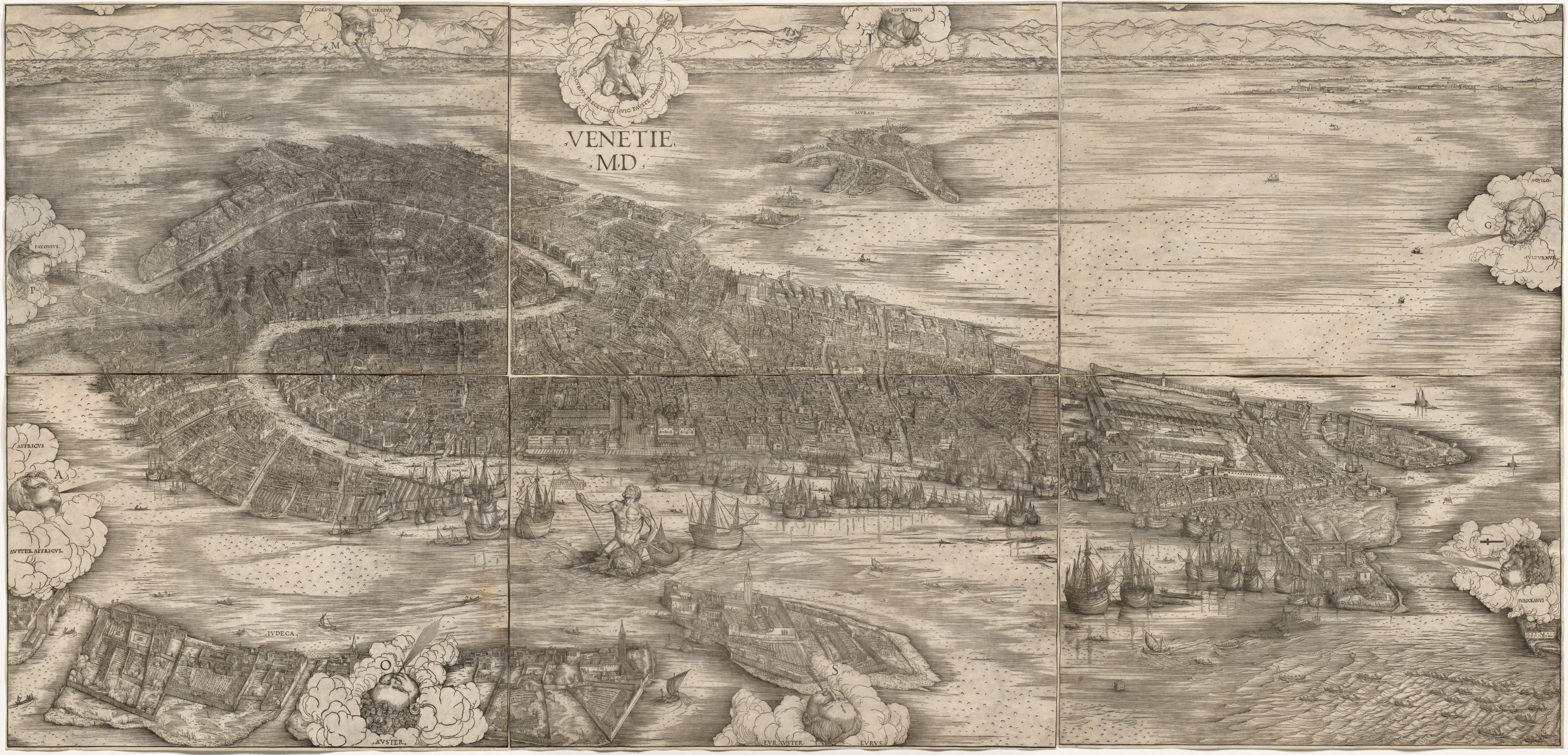
View of Venice, first state, 1500, Cleveland Museum of Art

== Bibliography ==
- Howard, Deborah (1997). "Venice as a Dolphin: Further Investigations into Jacopo De' Barbari's View". Artibus et Historiae. 18 (35): 101–111. doi:10.2307/1483541. JSTOR 1483541.
- Schulz, Juergen (1978). "Jacopo de' Barbari's View of Venice: Map Making, City Views, and Moralized Geography before the Year 1500". The Art Bulletin. 60 (3): 425–474. doi:10.2307/3049817. JSTOR 3049817.
