= San Geminiano, Venice =

Demolished church in Venice, Italy

San Geminiano
- Chiesa di San Geminiano
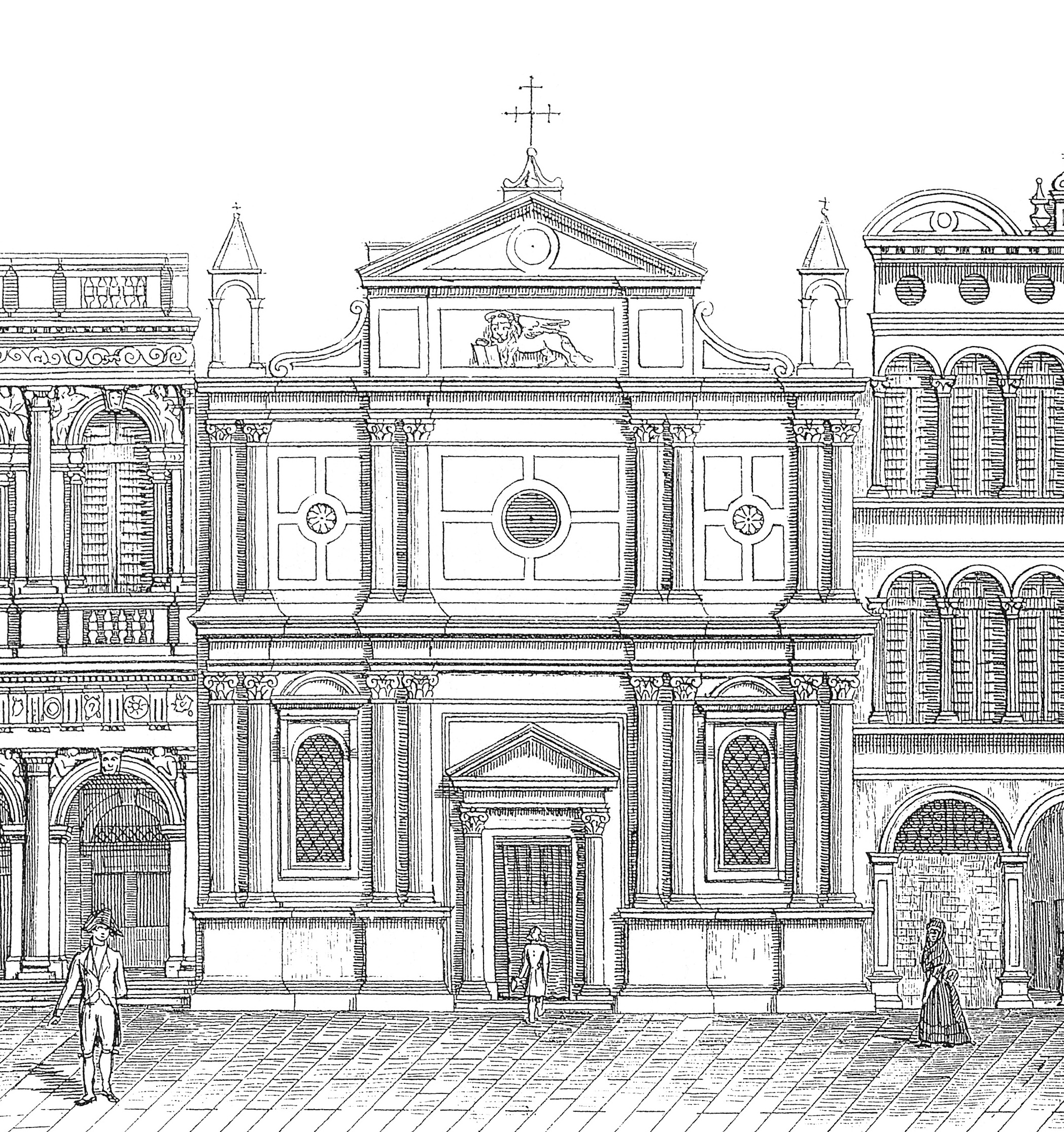
- The church's façade as depicted in an 1831 engraving by Dionisio Moretti
- San Geminiano
- 45°26′01.1″N 12°20′13.7″E
- Location: Venice, Veneto, Italy
- Denomination: Roman Catholic

History
- Status: Church
- Founded: c. 6th century AD (first church)
- Dedication: St Geminianus

Architecture
- Functional status: Demolished
- Architect(s): Cristoforo da Legname; Jacopo Sansovino
- Style: Renaissance
- Years built: 1505–1557
- Demolished: 1807

Specifications
- Materials: Stone and marble

Administration
- Archdiocese: Venice

San Geminiano was a Roman Catholic church located in Piazza San Marco in Venice, Italy, dedicated to Saint Geminianus. It is believed to have been founded by the Byzantines in the 6th century AD and it was destroyed and rebuilt several times over subsequent centuries. The last reconstruction began in 1505 to designs of the architect Cristoforo da Legname, and it was completed by Jacopo Sansovino in 1557. This church was a significant example of Venetian Renaissance architecture, and it was well-known for being ornate and richly decorated. The building was demolished in 1807 in order to make way for the Napoleonic wing of the Procuratie, and many of the artworks it contained were distributed among other churches and museums.

== History ==
According to tradition, the first church of Saint Geminianus in Venice was established in around 554 to 564 AD by the Byzantine general Narses. It is said to have been built in order to thank the Venetians for their assistance during a siege of Ravenna. It is unclear if this building was destroyed by fire in 976, and the church is first documented with certainty in 1023. It might have been destroyed during a series of fires and earthquakes in 1106. In the late 12th century, during the tenure of Doge Sebastiano Ziani, the church was demolished and rebuilt in another location in order to make way for the expansion of Piazza San Marco.

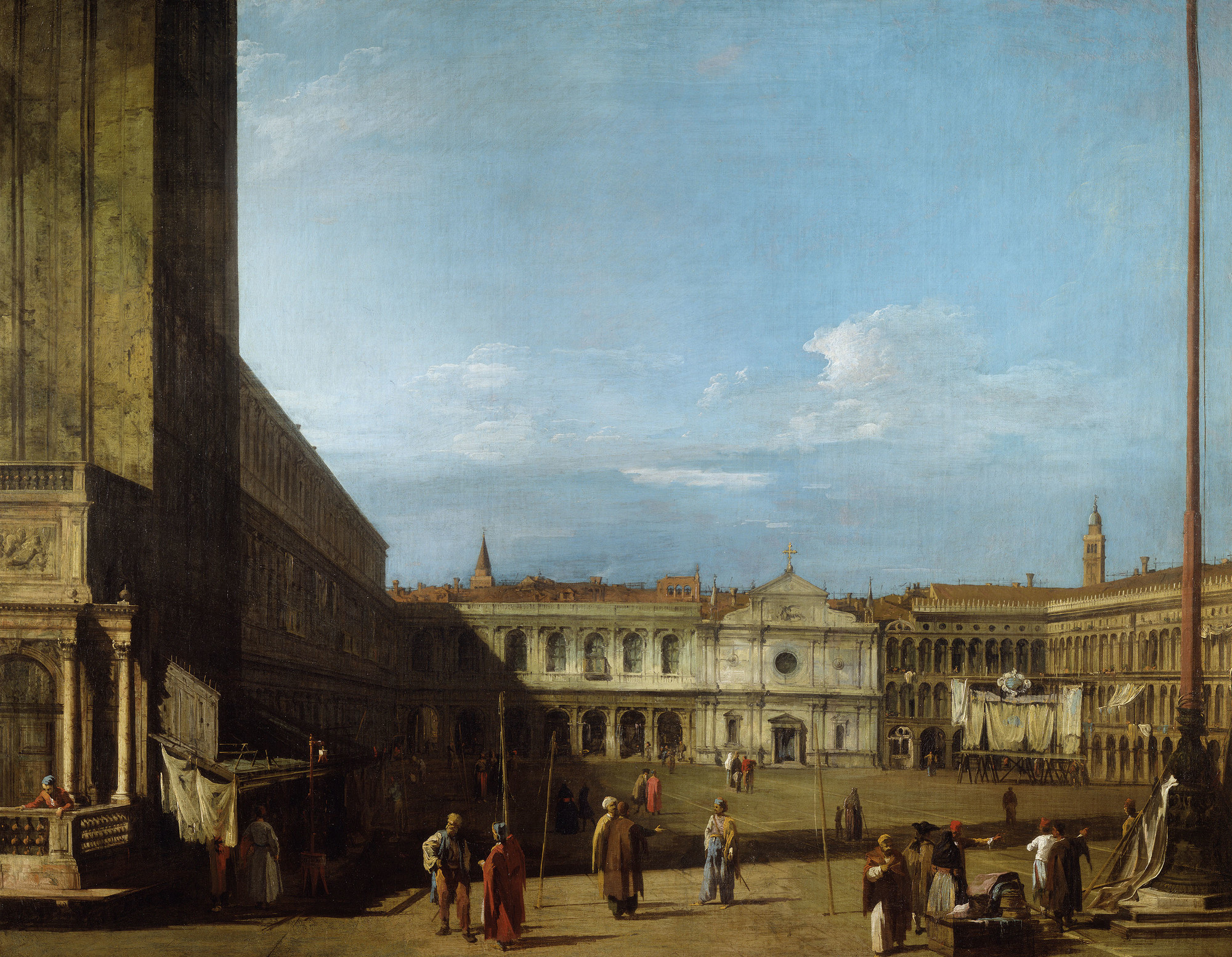
Venice: Piazza San Marco looking west towards San Geminiano (c. 1723–24), painting by Canaletto in the Royal Collection

The 12th century church was demolished and replaced once again in the early 16th century. Construction began in 1505 to designs of the architect Cristoforo da Legname, but by the middle of the century the building remained incomplete. In 1552 the church's procurator Tommaso Rangone commissioned the architect Jacopo Sansovino to design a façade for the building, which was to include a statue of himself. The Senate denied this proposal, but a statue of Rangone was later featured on the façade of the nearby church of San Zulian. After Sansovino finalised the church's design, works resumed and the building was completed in 1557. Sansovino was buried within the church after his death in 1570, and his children Fiorenza and Francesco were later also buried with him.

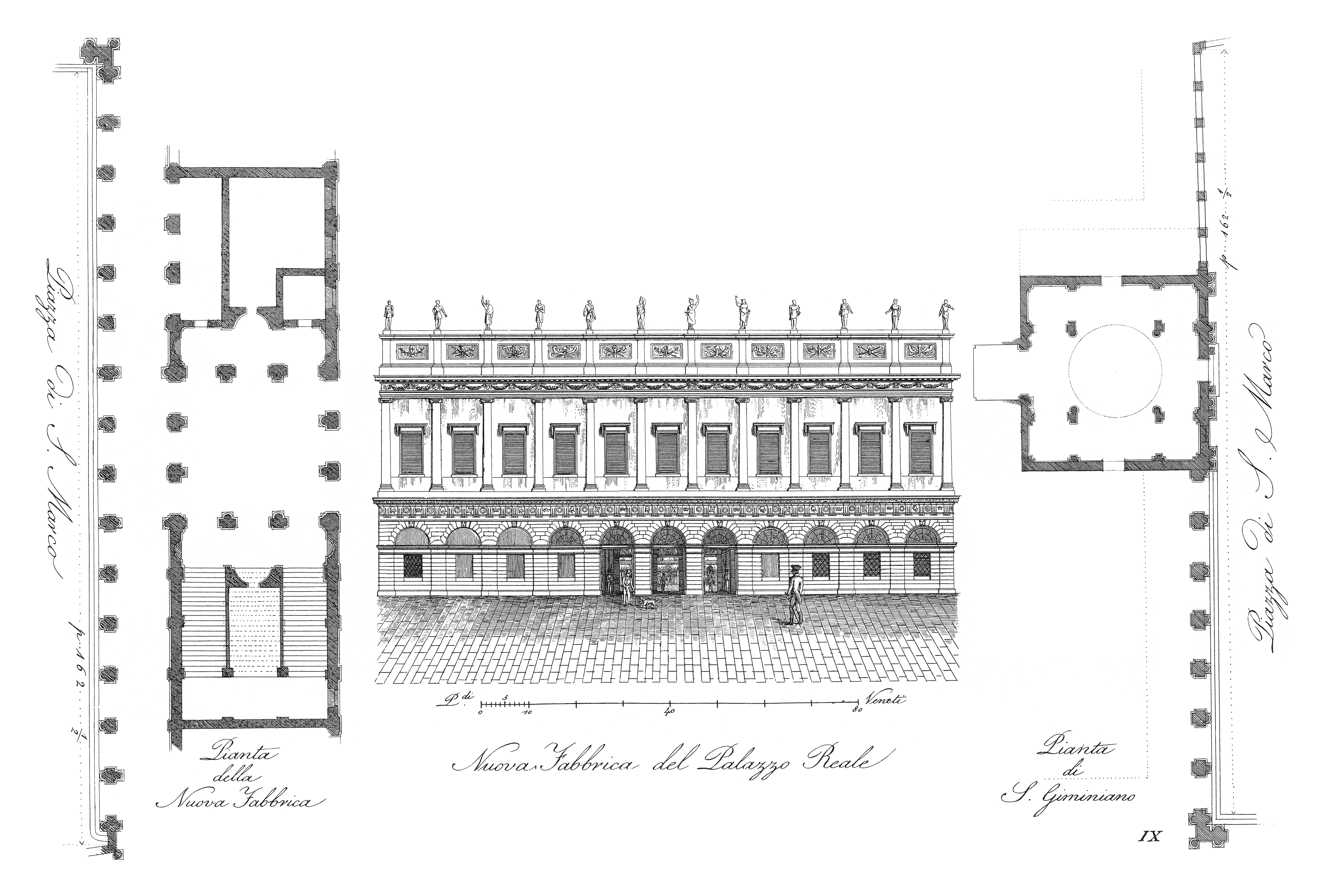
Plan of San Geminiano (right) and a plan and elevation of the Napoleonic wing of the Procuratie which replaced it (centre and left)

After the fall of the Republic of Venice in 1797, the church was used as barracks because of its strategic position at the centre of the city. It was later torn down in order to make way for the Napoleonic wing of the Procuratie, with demolition commencing on 19 May 1807. At this point, the church's artworks were dispersed among other churches and museums, Jacopo Sansovino's remains were reburied at the Seminario della Salute, and the relics of St Geminianus which had been held in the church were transferred to Nome di Gesù.

The church's demolition had been opposed by many artists including Leopoldo Cicognara. In his 1842 Hand-book for Travellers in Northern Italy, Sir Francis Palgrave lamented the demolition of San Geminiano as "Gallic vandalism, which has inflicted such irreparable injury upon the fine arts." Today, the site where the church formerly stood is marked by an inscription together with an elevation of its façade.

== Architecture ==
San Geminiano was a small but richly decorated church which was planned around a central dome. The façade had elegant proportions and it was decorated with marble and stone from Istria. Internally, the building had a nave which ended in a chapel containing the high altar, along with aisles on either side which ended in smaller chapels. The interior was lavishly decorated. The author Leonico Goldini described the building as "almost like a ruby among pearls" when compared to other churches in Venice, while Francesco Sansovino, whose father had designed the church, described it as "extremely rich and well-conceived in design."

== Artworks ==
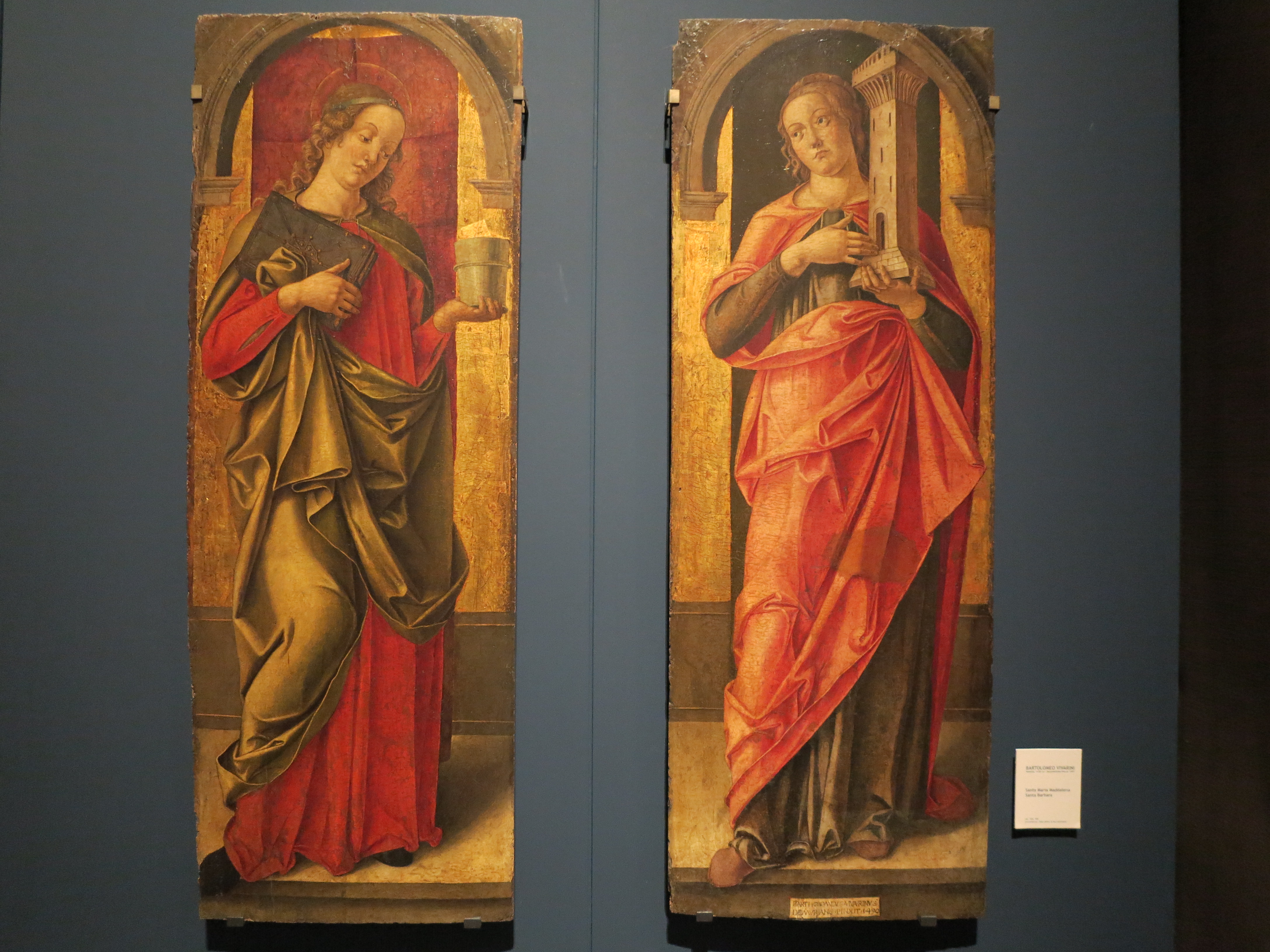
Saint Mary Magdalene and Saint Barbara (1490) by Bartolomeo Vivarini, formerly part of an altarpiece at San Geminiano

The church contained several significant works of Renaissance art, and after its demolition many of its artworks have been distributed to museums or other churches. The church contained a 1490 altarpiece by Bartolomeo Vivarini, and two panels from it (Saint Mary Magdalene and Saint Barbara) have been in the Accademia di Belle Arti di Venezia since 1812.

The doors of the church's organ had large panel paintings of Saints Geminianus and Severus and smaller paintings of John the Baptist and Menna. These were the work of Paolo Veronese, and they had been commissioned by Benedetto Manzini. They are now located in the Galleria Estense in Modena. One of the church's altars included the painting Saint Helena with Saints Geminianus and Menna (c. 1510) by Bernardino da Murano, which is now in the Accademia.

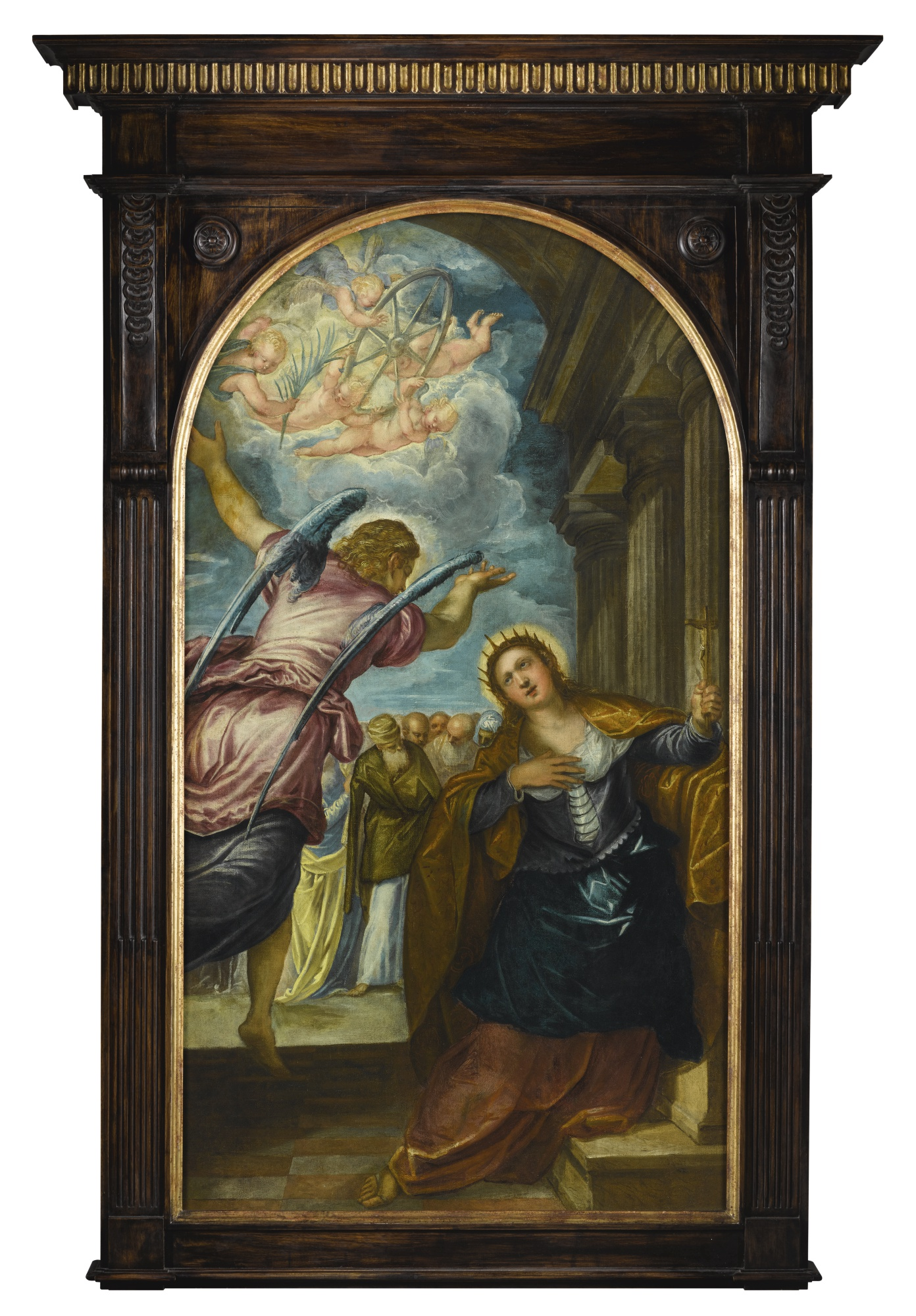
Angel Foretelling Saint Catharine of Her Martyrdom (c. 1560–70) by Tintoretto

The Scuola di Santa Caterina had an altar within the church, and it had an altarpiece which depicted Saint Catherine of Alexandria by Giovanni Bellini. This was replaced by the painting Angel Foretelling Saint Catharine of Her Martyrdom by Tintoretto in around 1560–70, and the Bellini painting has since been lost. When the church was demolished, Tintoretto's work was acquired by the Galleria dell'Accademia in Florence until it was sold in 1818. It was subsequently in the hands of various private collectors, including David Bowie who purchased it in 1987. Since 2019, the painting has been exhibited at the Doge's Palace on a long-term loan.

The church's marble high altar was designed by Cristoforo da Legname and it included statues of saints sculpted by Bartolomeo Bergamasco within niches. This has been relocated to Venice's church of San Giovanni di Malta. Busts of the priests Matteo e' Eletto and Benedetto Manzini which were sculpted by Bergamasco and Alessandro Vittoria respectively originally flanked this altar, and they are now located in the Galleria Giorgio Franchetti alla Ca' d'Oro. Another bust by Vittoria which depicted Tommaso Rangone was located on a vestibule and it is now found in the Ateneo Veneto.

The church also contained works by Gerolamo Santacroce, Giuseppe Scolari, Ludovico Spinelli, Alvise dal Friso, Gerolamo Brusaferro, Sebastiano Ricci and Gregorio Lazzarini.

== See also ==
- 16th-century Western domes
