= Bacchus (Jacopo Sansovino) =

Sculpture by Jacopo Sansovino

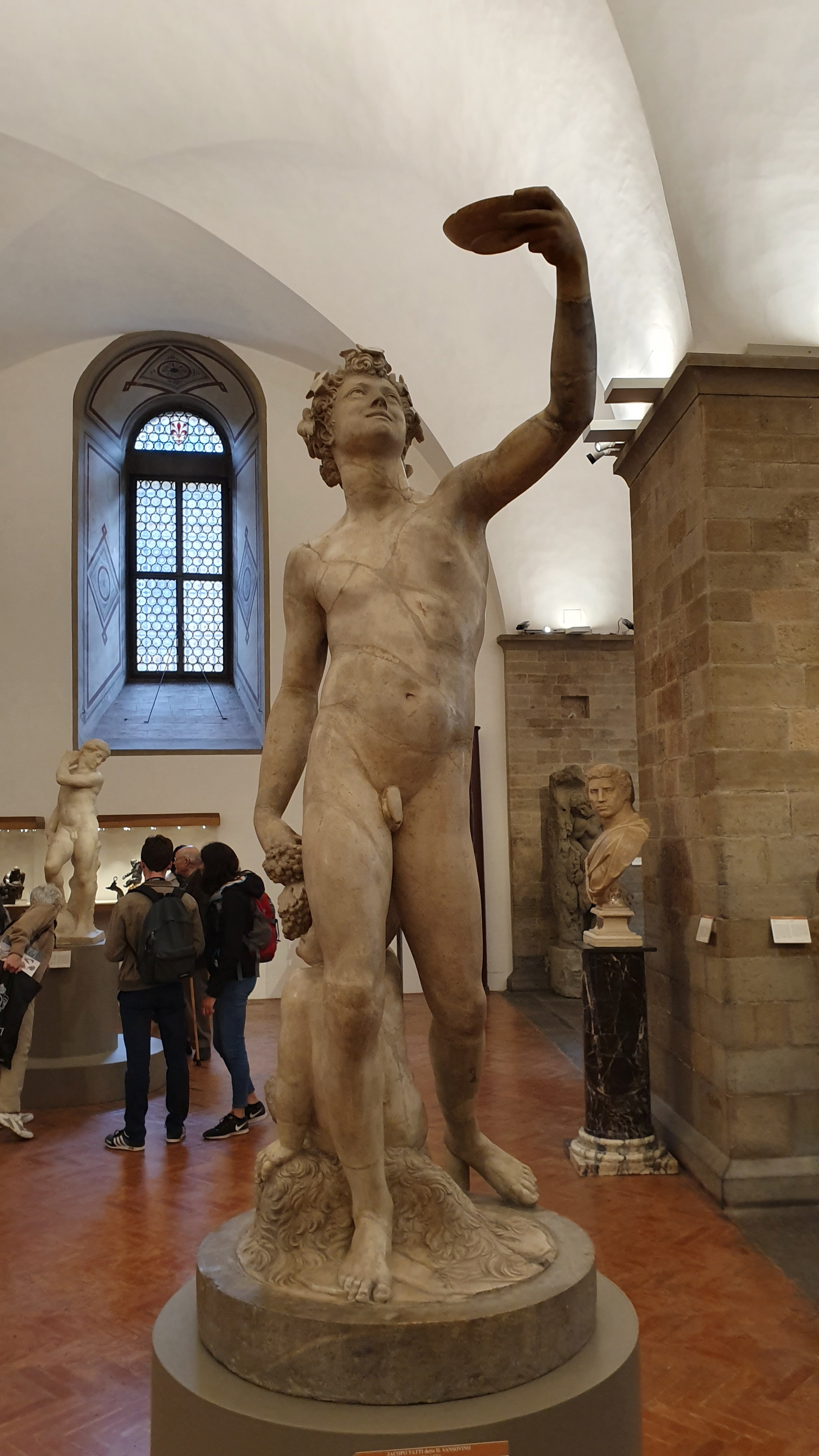
- Artist: Jacopo Sansovino
- Year: 1515
- Type: Marble
- Dimensions: 146 cm (57 in)
- Location: Museo Nazionale del Bargello, Florence

Bacchus is a marble sculpture by Italian artist Jacopo Sansovino, datable to 1515. It is held at the National Museum of the Bargello, in Florence.

== History ==
The sculpture was created by Jacopo Sansovino to decorate the garden of Giovanni Bartolini, in Florence, as part of a program of recovery of the forms of classical antiquity as was being promoted by the Neoplatonic Academy. It was later bought by Cosimo I and went to decorate his apartment in the Palazzo Vecchio, with works by Michelangelo, Baccio Bandinelli and Benvenuto Cellini.

The current work was widely admired in Florence and much better known than Michelangelo's Bacchus (who only arrived in the city in 1571 or 1572), and it was taken as a model for sculptors and painters. There are countless citations, drawings and printed reproductions and derivations of this sculpture in the most diverse materials.

In 1762 it was seriously damaged by the fire in the west corridor of the Uffizi.

In 1864 Perkins called it "one of the best statues ever conceived according to the ancient spirit", and French historian Salomon Reinach, in is Répertoire de la Statuaire Grecque et Romaine (1897, 3 volumes), even mistook it for an ancient work, including it among the iconographies of Dionysus, although it had already been published by Gori in his repertoire of Florentine sculpture.

== Description and style ==
The statue evokes the pagan god Bacchus, represented here as a young god who joyfully raises the bowl with which the ancients drank wine to the sky, while looking up smiling. He holds bunches of grapes with his right hand, and has a satyr hidden behind his right leg. It echoes works by his master sculptor Andrea Sansovino and the classical works that he must have seen in Rome, as well as the recent frescoes by Raphael, such as Apollo and Marsyas and the Judgment of Solomon in the vault of the Stanza della Segnatura (1508).

It is not clear if Sansovino had a precise ancient model as a reference or if this was his own interpretation of the past. It seems likely that the artist was inspired by several works, including, as indicated by Daniela Gallo, the Apollo Belvedere for Bacchus, and one of the Dioscuri di Montecavallo for the little satyr behind him.
