= Francesco Sansovino =

Italian scholar and humanist (1521–1586)

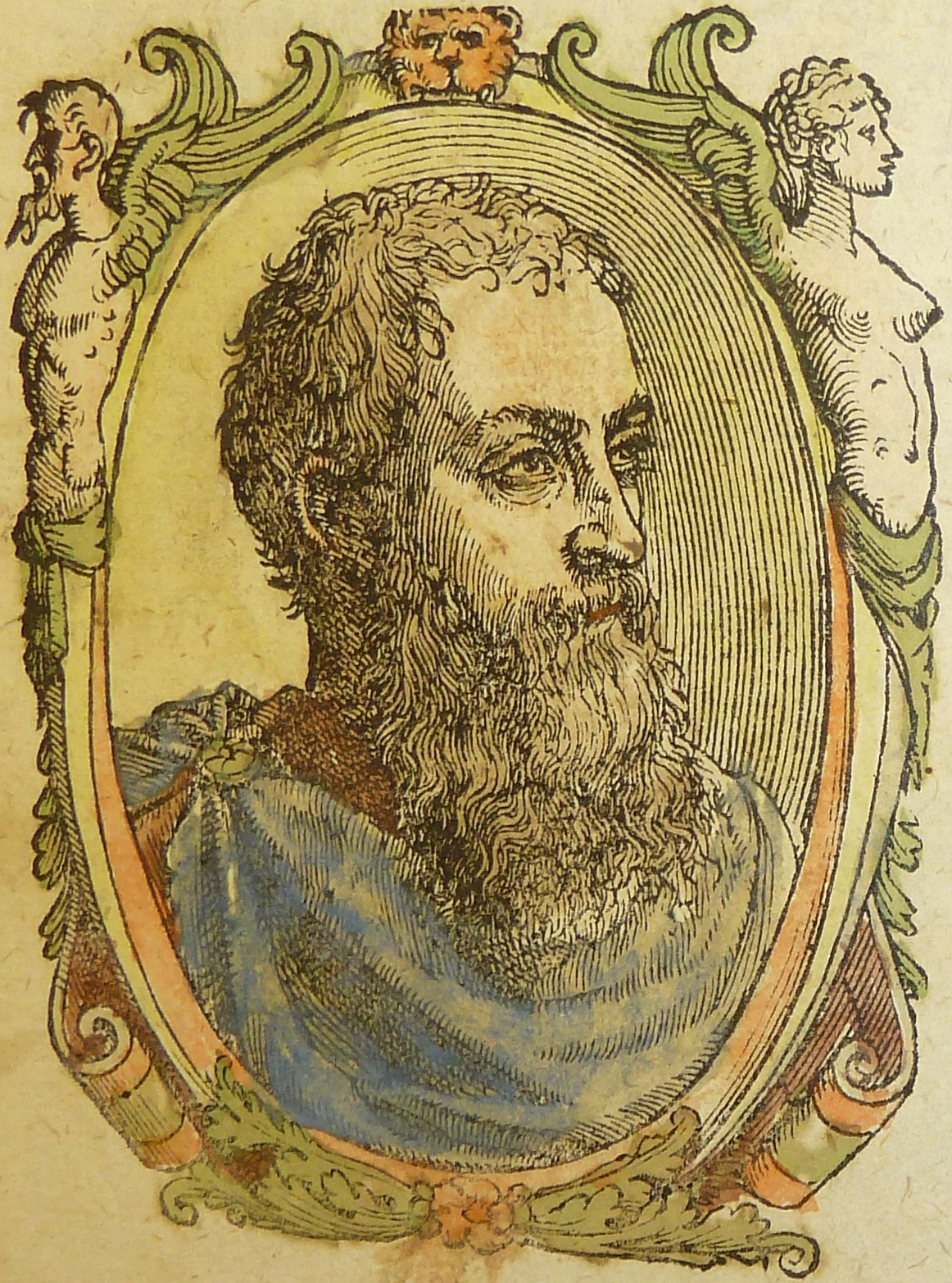
Portrait of Francesco Sansovino

Francesco Tatti da Sansovino (1521–1586) was a versatile Italian scholar, humanist (one of the most important of his century) and man of letters, also known as a publisher.

== Biography ==
Francesco Sansovino was born in Rome, the son of the sculptor Jacopo Sansovino, but soon moved to Venice and later studied law at the universities of Padua and Bologna.

== Works ==
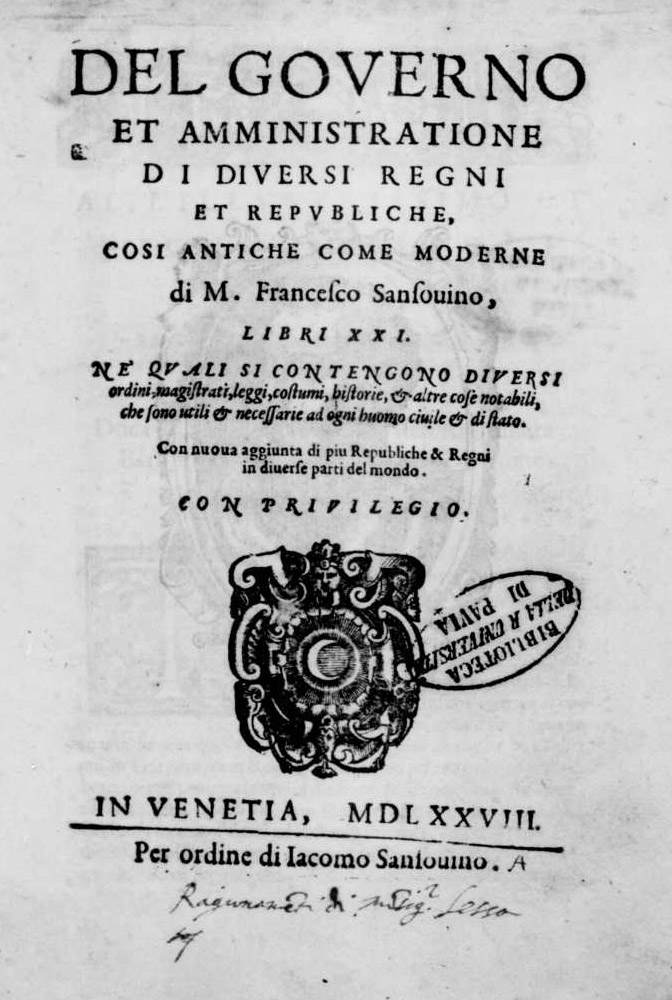
Del governo dei regni e delle repubbliche così antiche come moderne, 1578

Sansovino is perhaps most known for his 1581 work Venetia città nobilissima et singolare, Descritta in XIIII. Libri, known briefly as Venezia Descritta. He was also a literary critic, writing in particular on Dante and Giovanni Boccaccio.

- Del governo e amministrazione di diversi regni e republiche (1562)
- Della materia medicinale, Venice, Giovanni Andrea Valvassori, 1562.
- Del governo e amministrazione di diversi regni e republiche (1562)
- L'historia di casa Orsina di Francesco Sansouino, Venice 1565
- Dell'origine dei Cavalieri, Venice, 1566.
- Del governo dei regni e delle repubbliche così antiche come moderne (in Italian). Venice: Giovanni Antonio Bertano. 1578.
- Venetia, città nobilissima, et singolare, Descritta in XIIII libri (1581); 1663 edition
- Le antichità di Beroso Caldeo Sacerdote. Et d'altri scrittori, così Hebrei, come Greci et Latini, che trattano delle stesse materie (1583)
- Concetti politici (1583) found in Propositioni, overo considerationi in materia di cose di Stato, sotto titolo di avvertimenti, avvedimenti civili et concetti politici (1588)
- Historia universale dell'origine et imperio de'Turchi: Con le guerre successe in Persia, in Ongaria, in Transilvania, Valachia, sino l'anno 1600 (1600)
