= Geminianus =

Bishop of Modena and saint (4th century)

Saint Geminianus
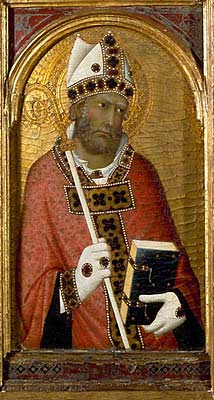
- Saint Geminianus, from pentaptych by Simone Martini (c.1284-1344) now at Fitzwilliam Museum, Cambridge.
- Died: fourth century
- Venerated in: Roman Catholic Church, Orthodox Church
- Feast: 31 January
- Attributes: bishop holding a mirror in which the Virgin Mary is reflected; a bishop holding a model of the town of San Gimignano; a man calming a storm at sea; or a man exorcising the daughter of the Byzantine emperor Jovian.

Saint Geminianus (also known as Saint Geminian, or Saint Gimignano) was a fourth-century deacon who became Bishop of Modena. He is mentioned in the year 390, when he participated in a council called by Saint Ambrose in Milan. From his name, it has been deduced that Geminianus probably belonged to the caste of Roman senators.

Nothing more is directly known about him, and all information regarding his life comes from much later biographies. It is said that when Saint Athanasius was entering exile in Gallia, he passed through Modena and was received kindly by Geminianus. Saint John Chrysostom later received the same hospitality. Saint Geminianus opposed Arianism and Jovinianism. He probably died on 31 January 397.

== Veneration ==
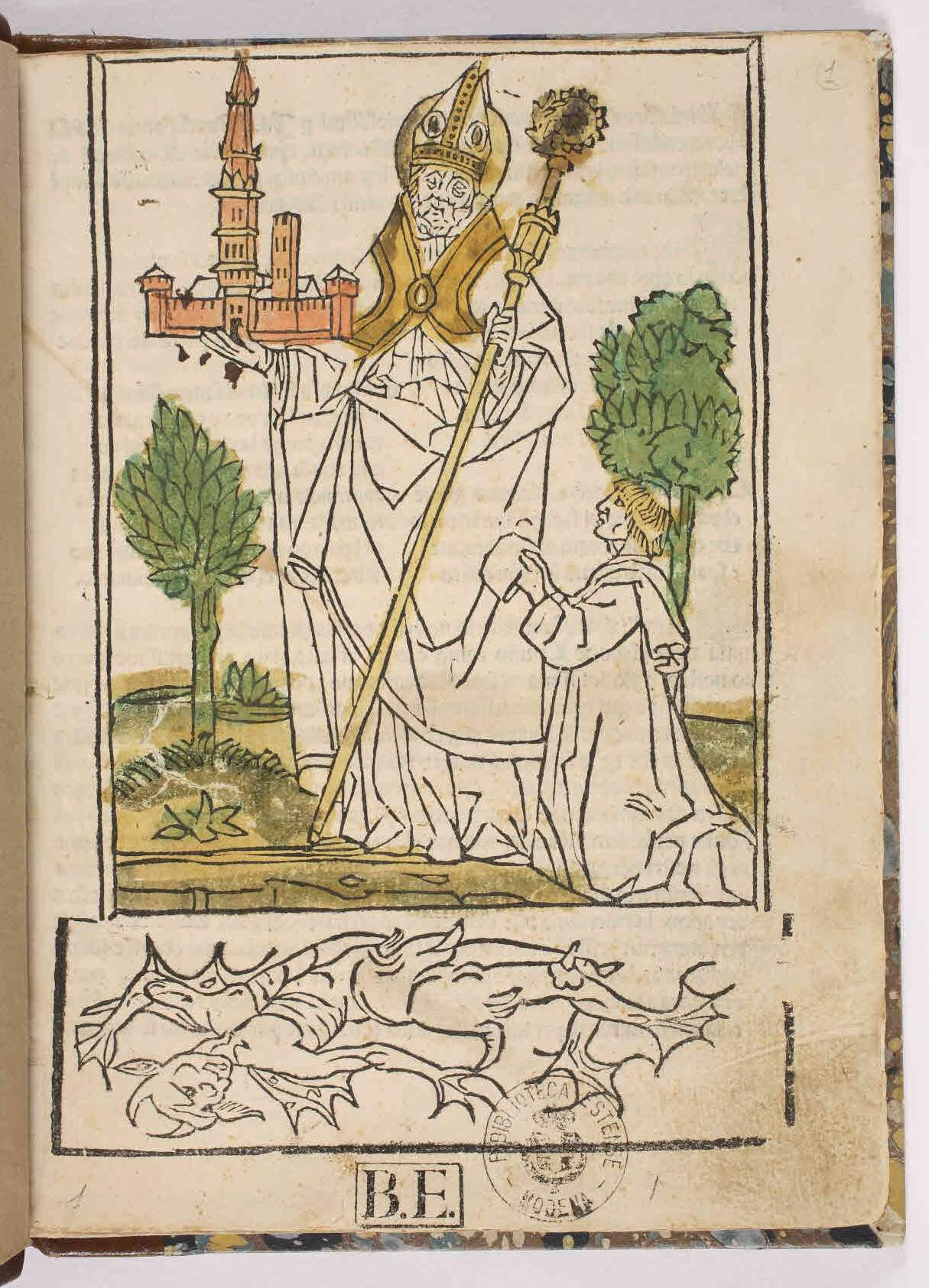
Giovanni Maria Parente, Vita di san Gimignano, 1495

Traces of his veneration have always been present in Modena. As early as the fifth century a church had been erected over his tomb, contiguous with the present cathedral and outside the center of the original Roman town. In the early Middle Ages, moreover, Modena is often mentioned as Civitas Geminiana.

The Relatio translationis S. Giminiani, a manuscript of the twelfth century, describes the translation and recognition of the body of Saint Geminianus on 30 April 1106 and 7 October 1106, respectively, in the presence of Paschal II, Matilde di Canossa, and all of the Modenesi. A second recognition of the relics was made by Lucius III, on 12 July 1184, while on his way to Verona.

It is said his miraculous intercession saved them from the invading Huns, when he conjured up dense fog that hid the city.

Geminianus rarely appears in art outside of Modena, but when shown is typically depicted as a bishop holding a model of the town of Modena; a man calming a storm at sea; or a man exorcising the daughter of the Byzantine emperor Jovian.

The saint is also venerated in Tuscany, especially in the eponymous town of San Gimignano, and in Pontremoli. A Church of St Geminianus opposite St Mark's Basilica, in Venice's Piazza San Marco, was demolished in 1807 as part of the reorganisation of the west side of the square during the Napoleonic era.
