= San Giovanni di Malta, Venice =

San Giovanni di Malta
- Chiesa Priorale di San Giovanni Battista dei Cavalieri di Malta
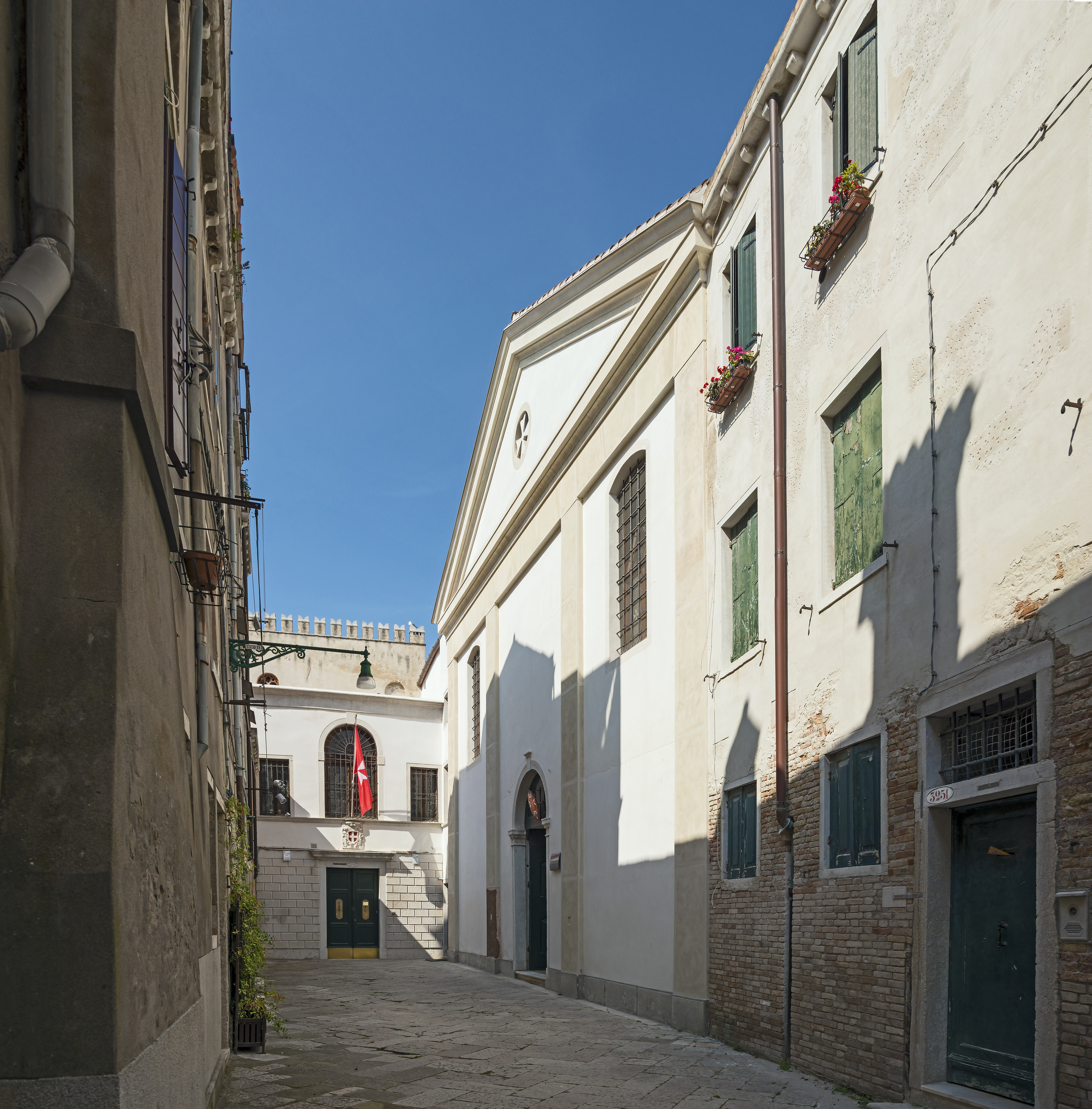
- The church's façade in 2014
- San Giovanni di Malta
- 45°26′11.13″N 12°20′46.3″E
- Location: Venice, Veneto, Italy
- Denomination: Roman Catholic
- Religious order: Knights Hospitaller
- Website: www.sangiovannidimalta.com

History
- Status: Church
- Founded: c. 12th century
- Dedication: John the Baptist

Architecture
- Functional status: Active
- Years built: 1498–1505

Specifications
- Materials: Brick and timber

Administration
- Archdiocese: Venice

San Giovanni di Malta (Italian: Chiesa Priorale di San Giovanni Battista dei Cavalieri di Malta), also known as San Giovanni del Tempio or San Giovanni dei Furlani, is a Roman Catholic church in the Castello sestiere of Venice, Italy, dedicated to John the Baptist. It is believed to have been established by the Knights Hospitaller (also known as the Knights of Malta) sometime after 1187, although it is sometimes linked to the Knights Templar. The present building was constructed between 1498 and 1505, and it is located adjacent to a priory. The property was taken over by the state in 1806 and the church was closed in 1810, but in 1841 it was handed over to the Sovereign Military Order of Malta, who reopened the church in 1843.

== History ==
The origins of the church are unclear. Its original name was San Giovanni del Tempio, and due to this some historians believed that it had been established by the Knights Templar and was passed on to the Knights Hospitaller after the Templars were suppressed in 1312. It is now believed that the church was actually established by the Hospitallers after Gerardo, Archbishop of Ravenna issued an edict on 9 November 1187 donating a plot of land in Venice to the Order so as to construct a church and hospital. A priory and hospital named after St Catherine of Alexandria is located adjacent to the church.

The church was completely reconstructed between 1498 and 1505 during the tenure of Grand Prior Fra Sebastiano Michiel, and the oldest known depiction of the building is in the 1500 View of Venice by Jacopo de' Barbari. The building also came to be known as San Giovanni dei Furlani among locals after a community of Friulians that lived in its vicinity. The church later became known as San Giovanni di Malta after the Hospitallers established their main base in Malta in 1530 and were commonly referred to as the Knights of Malta.

The Hospitaller Grand Priory of Venice was disbanded on 30 April 1806 when Venice was under Napoleonic French control, and the Order's property including the church of San Giovanni were taken over by the state. The priory was rented out to various tenants, and the church was closed in 1810 and had its altars and paintings removed. The church was subsequently converted into a theatre, and it was also used by printers or as storage space.

The Grand Priory of Lombardy and Venice of the Sovereign Military Order of Malta, the successor to the Hospitallers, was reestablished in 1839. On 5 January 1841 Emperor Ferdinand I of Austria returned the church to the Order, and it was reopened on 24 June 1843. At this point, sculptures from other suppressed churches were installed within the church.

Restoration of the church and priory took place between 2012 and 2014.

== Architecture ==
The church has a long nave with a ceiling constructed out of timber and brick. There are several altars along the side walls, containing 18th century paintings of saints.

The church's main altar dates back to the early 16th century, and it was taken from the church of San Geminiano that was demolished in 1807. It was designed by Cristoforo da Legname and it contains statues of saints sculpted by Bartolomeo Bergamasco.

== Artworks ==
Several artworks can be found within the church, including Baptism of Christ by the studio of Giovanni Bellini and a copy of Titian's Saint John the Baptist.
