= San Zulian =

Church in Venice

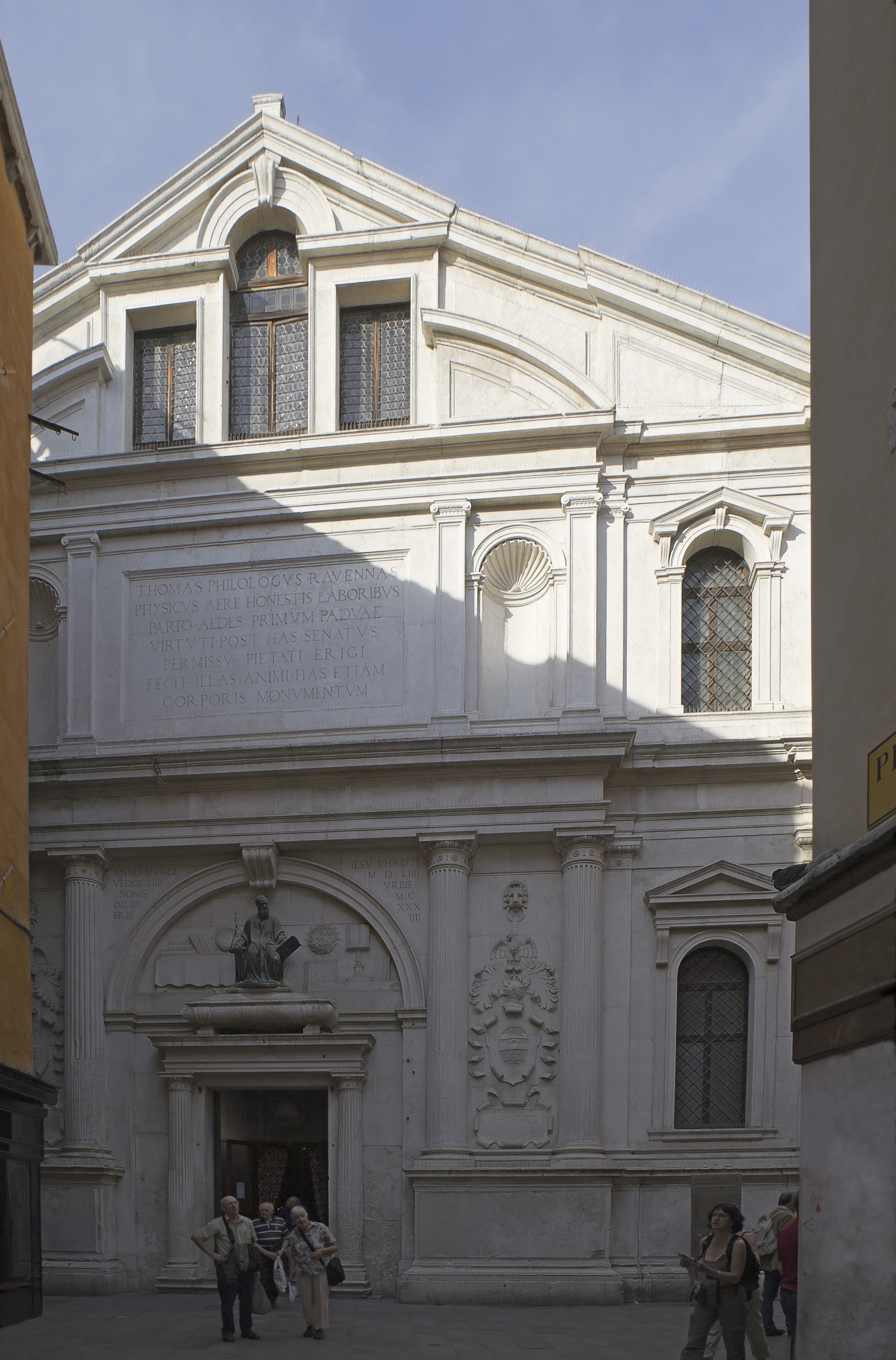
- San Zulian

- Location within Venice Location within Italy

Religion
- Affiliation: Roman Catholic
- Province: Venice

Location
- Location: Venice, Italy
- Coordinates: 45°26′8.5″N 12°20′19.2″E

Architecture
- Completed: 9th century

The Chiesa di San Giuliano (Church of St Julian), commonly known by its Venetian name of San Zulian, is a church on the Mercerie, the main shopping street of Venice, Italy, in the parish of San Salvador.

Originally built in the 9th century, it underwent a number of reconstructions, including probably after the 1105 fire of the neighborhood. The façade was constructed in 1553-1554 by Jacopo Sansovino, and completed after his death in 1570 by Alessandro Vittoria.

The flattened classical temple façade was paid for by the scholar Tommaso Rangone, whose bronze seated portrait appears above the door. In his hands, the physician Rangone holds sarsaparilla and guaiacum, two plants which he used to treat syphilis and yellow fever. The reliefs also depict a map of the world as was known at his death. As befitting his broad-ranging interests in classical texts, the flanking inscriptions are in Latin (center), Greek (right) and Hebrew (left) text.

The interior was also designed by Sansovino, and the church consecrated in 1580.

== Main artworks ==
Facade elements

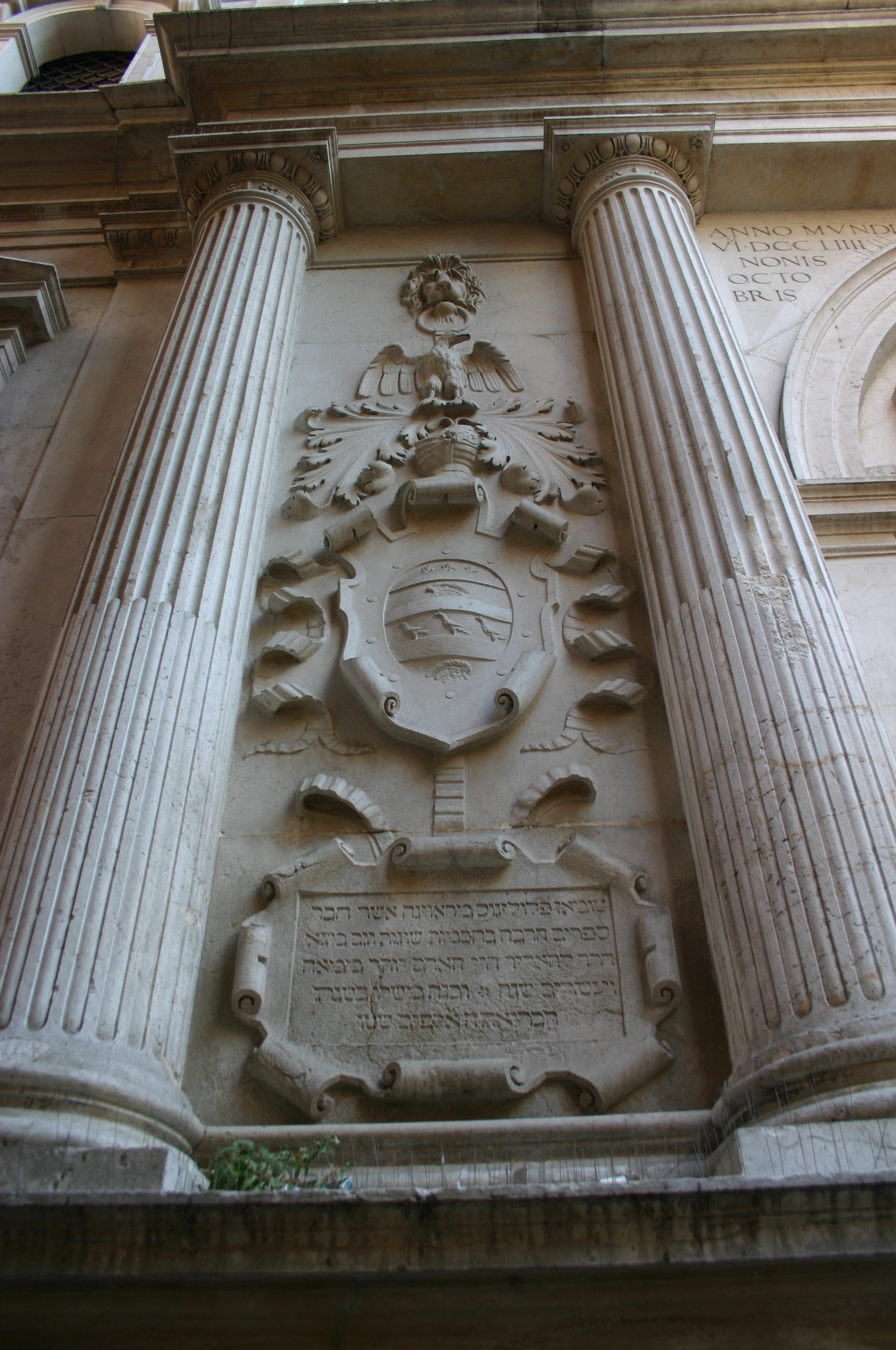
Facade left.

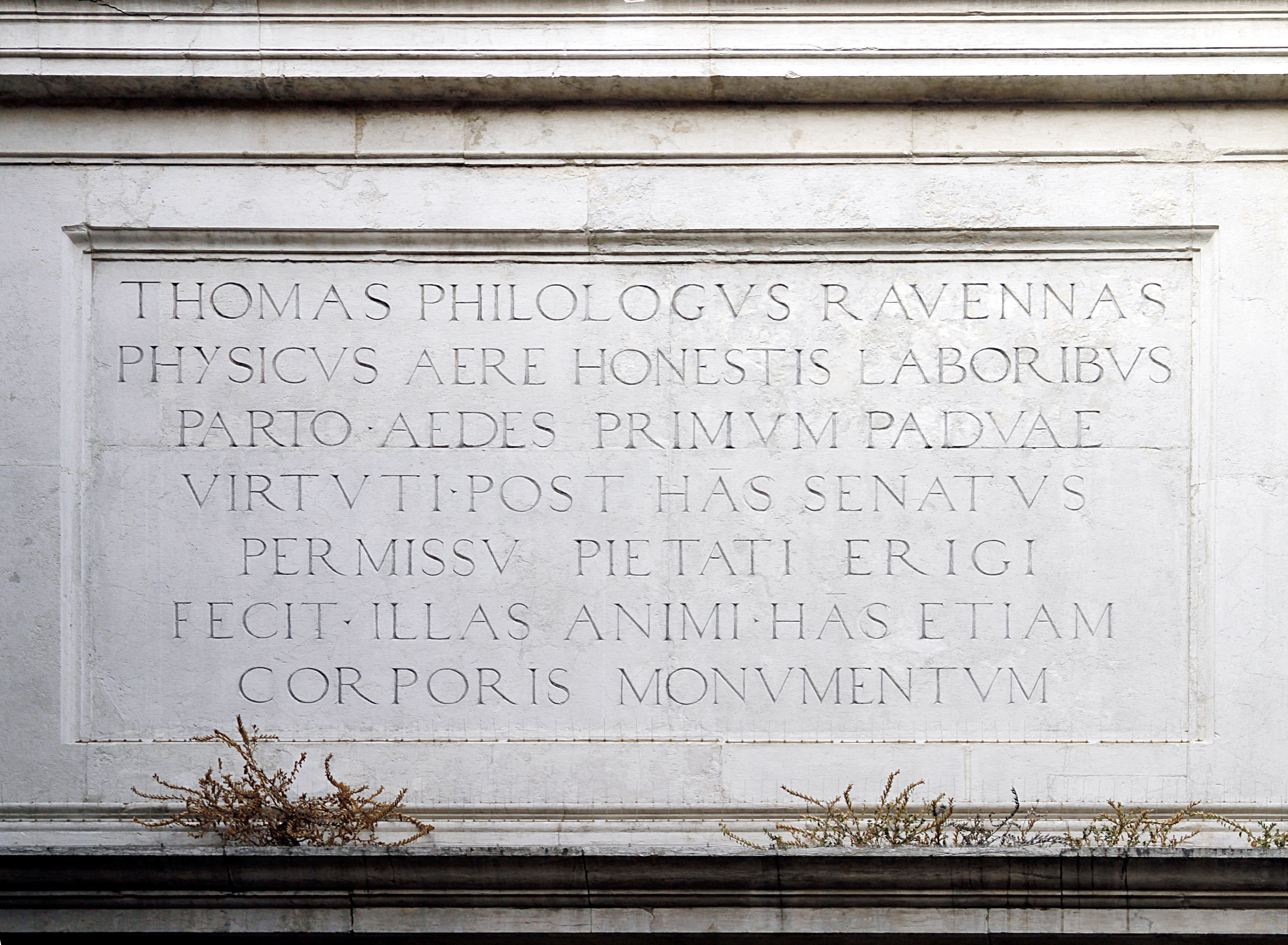
Latin dedication Lintel.

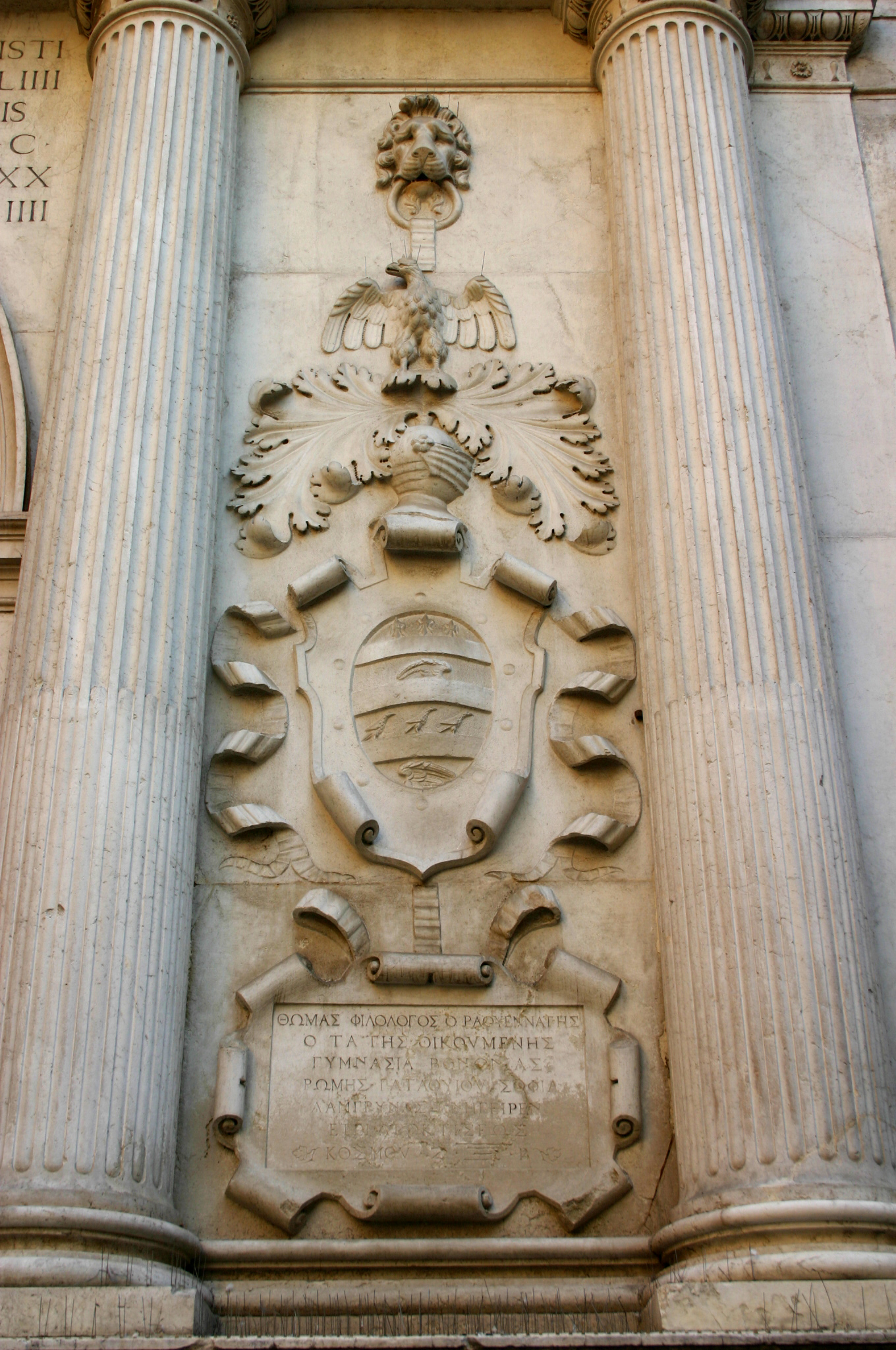
Facade right.
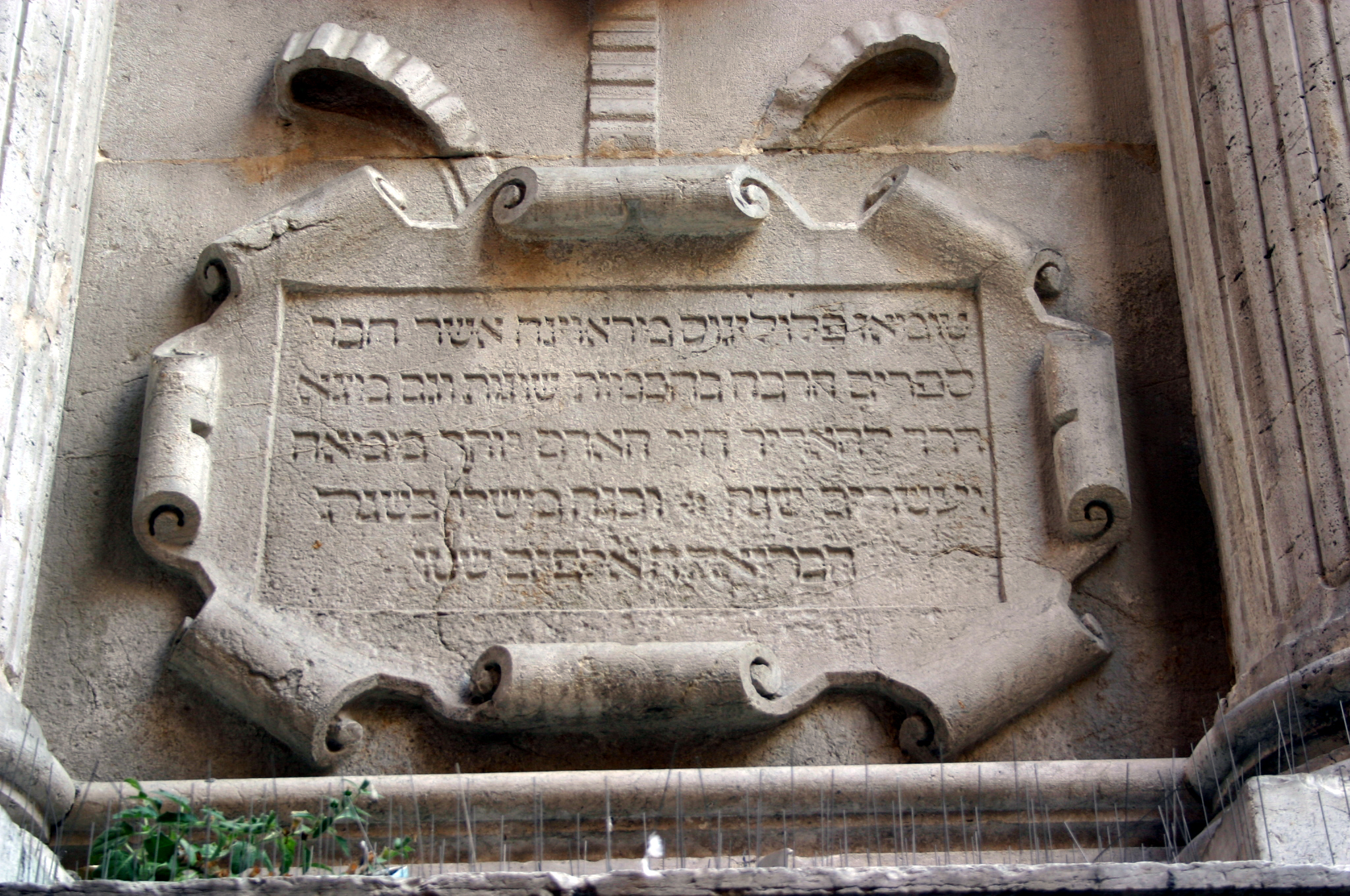
Hebrew inscription.

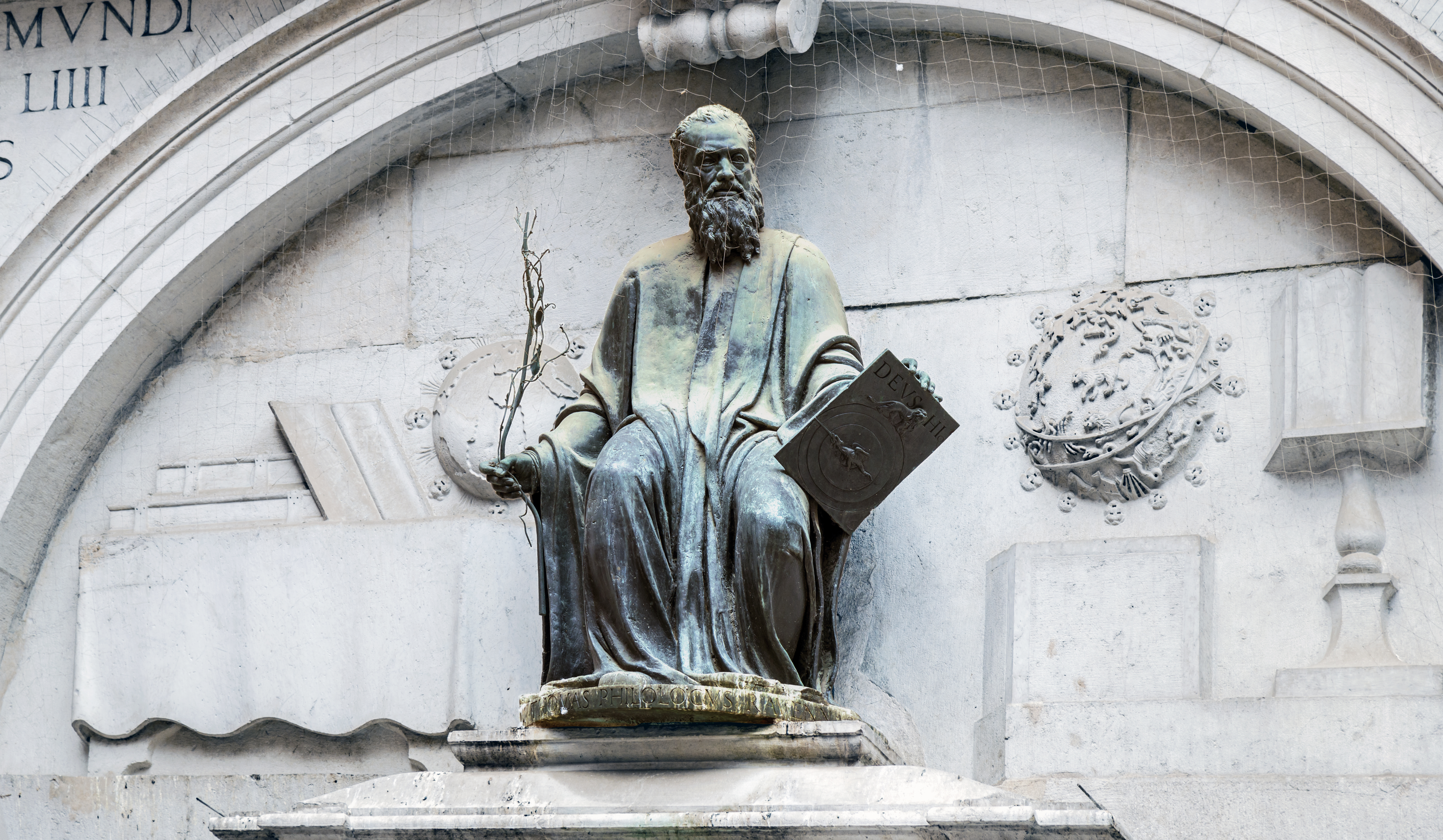
Statue of Tomas Rangone

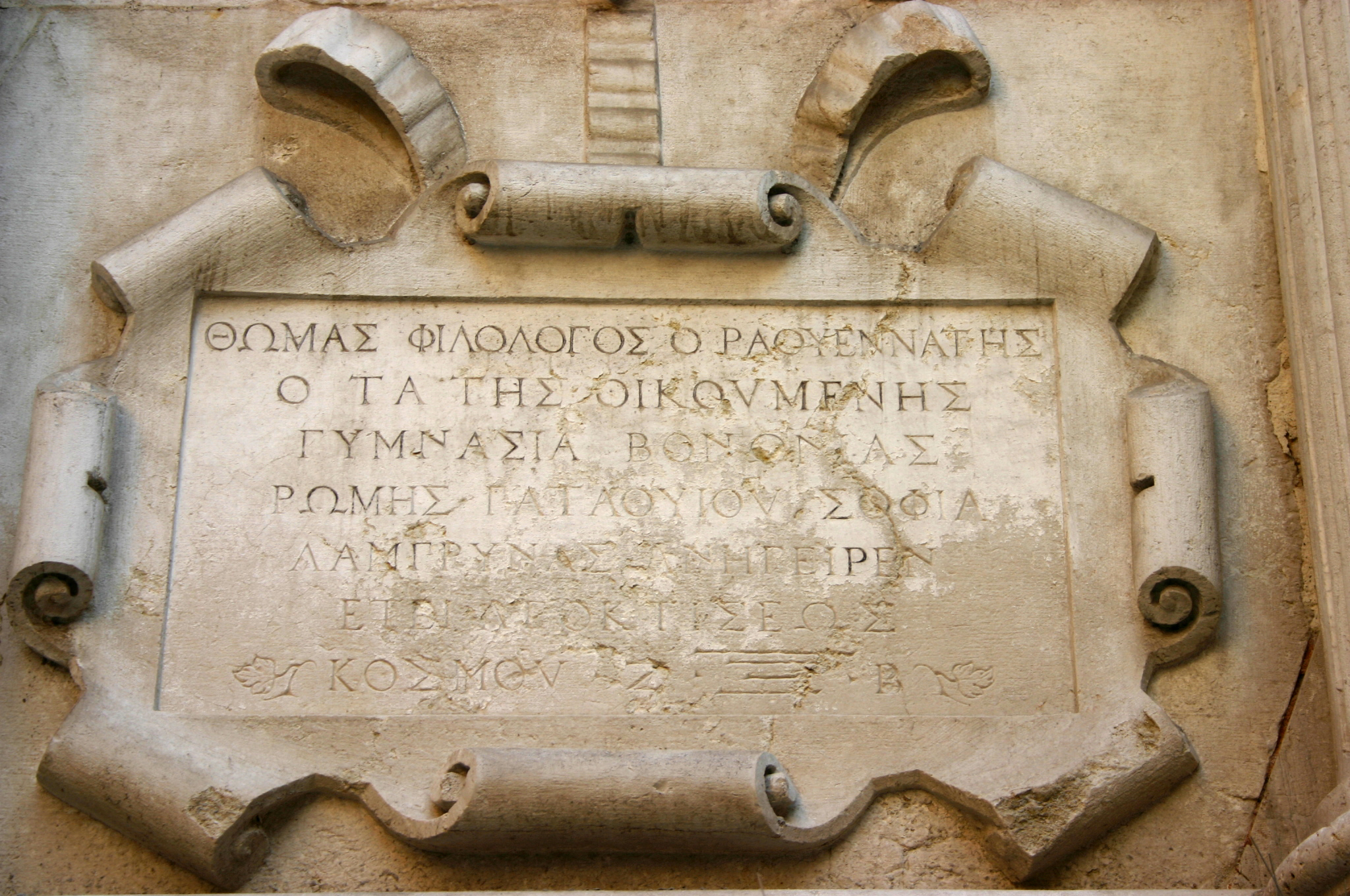
Greek inscription.

Interior

- Girolamo Campagna (terracotta figures of the Virgin Mary and Mary Magdalene and a marble altar panel in the chapel to the left of the high altar)
- Palma the Younger (St Julian in Glory on the central panel of the ceiling)
- Paolo Veronese (Pietà with SS Roch, Jerome and Mark on the south wall)
- The upper walls are painted by Leonardo Corona, Giovanni Fiammingo, and Palma.
- Organ from 1764 opus 12 by Gaetano Callido
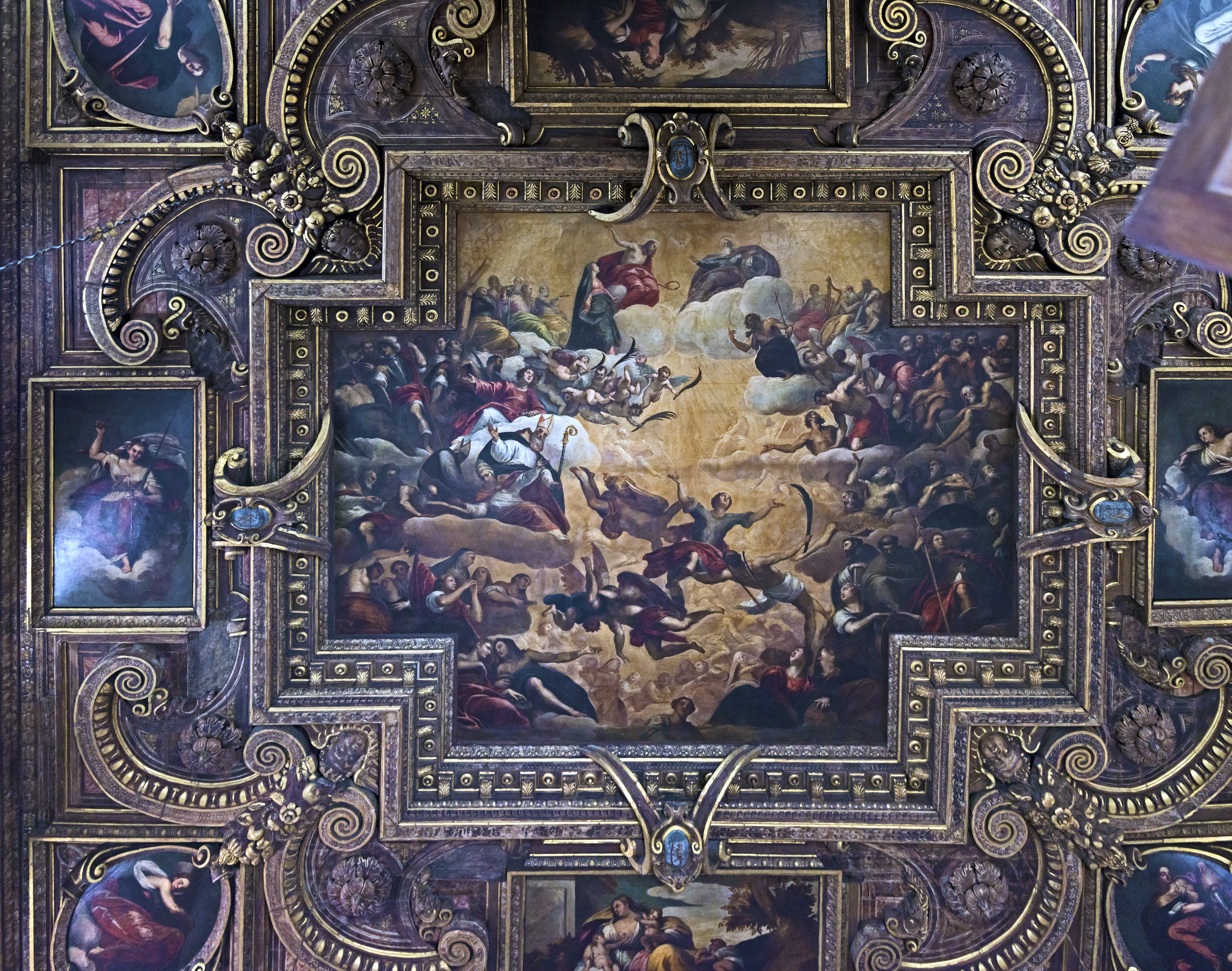
St Julian in Glory Palma the Younger

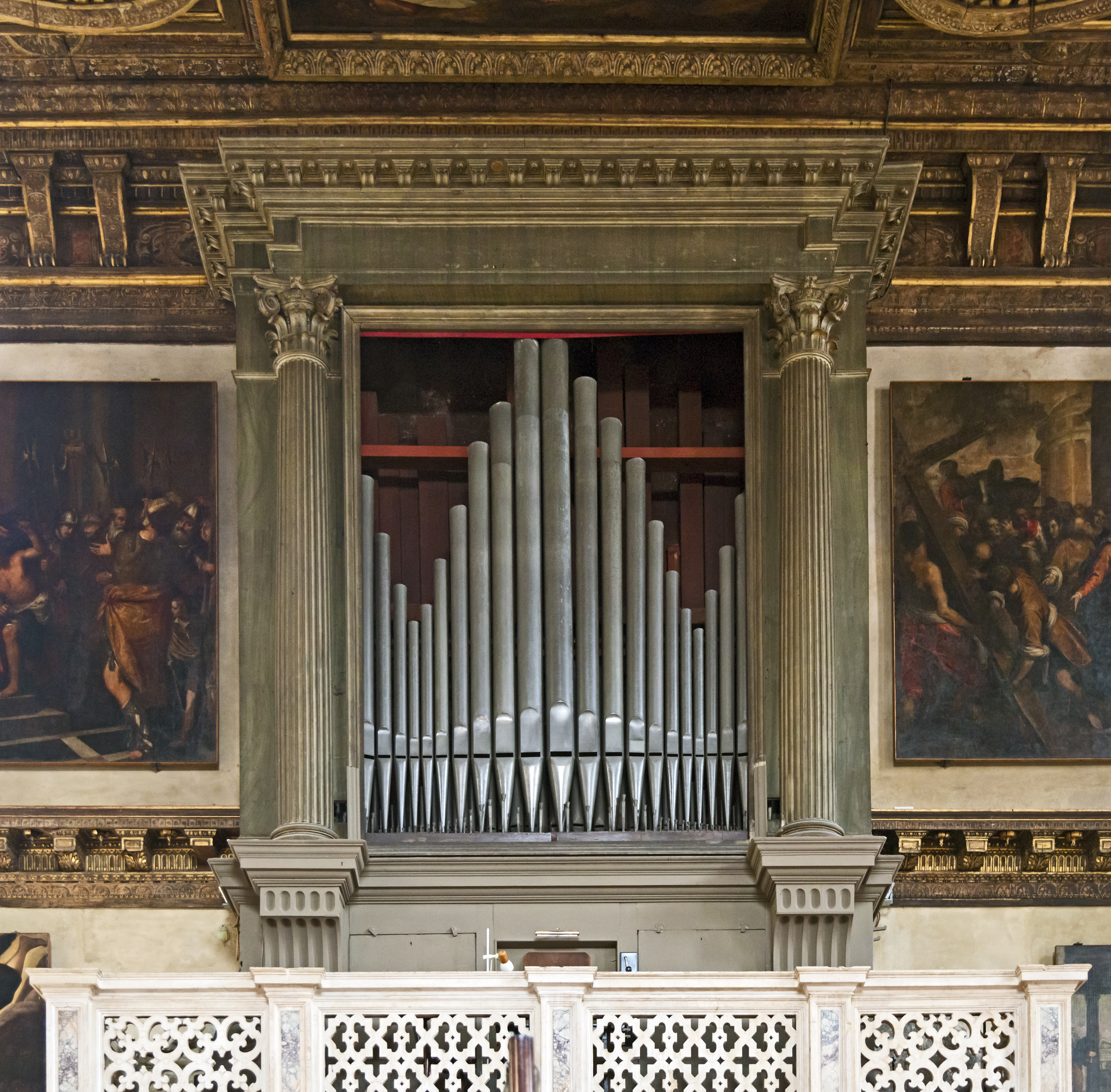
Organ by Gaetano Callido
