= Jacopo Sansovino =

Italian architect and sculptor (1486–1570)

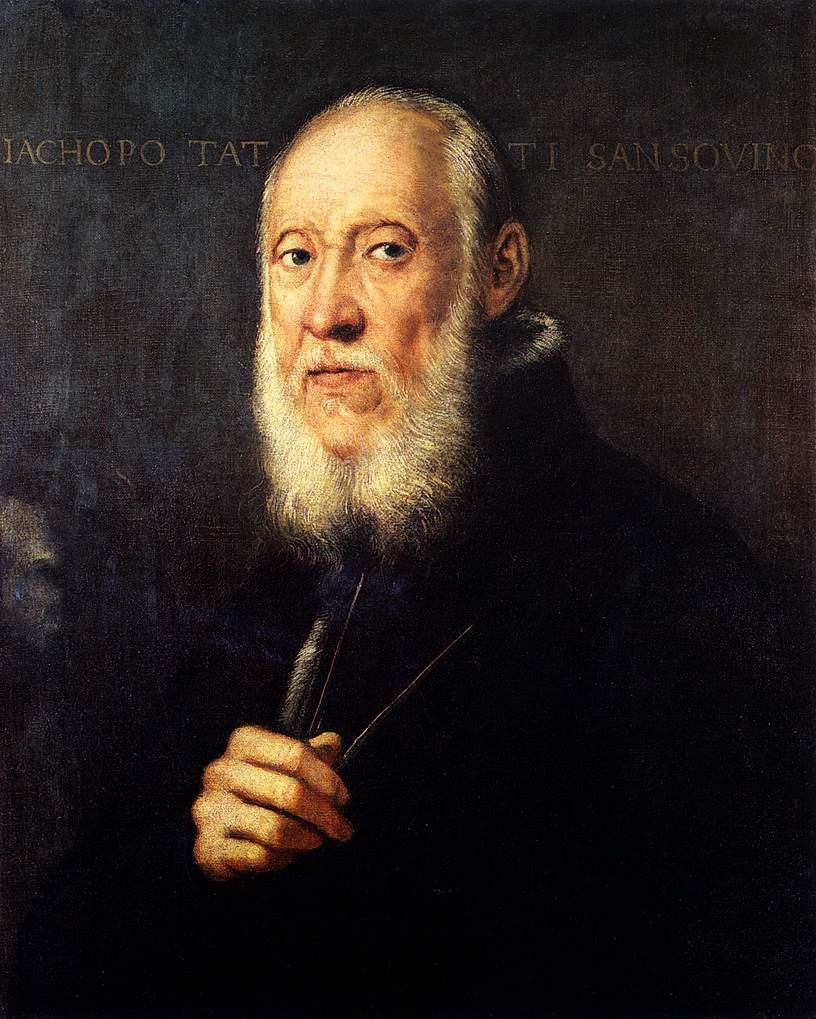
- Jacopo Sansovino in a portrait by Tintoretto (c. 1560–1570)
- Born: 2 July 1486; Florence, Republic of Florence
- Died: 27 November 1570 (aged 84); Venice, Republic of Venice
- Known for: Architecture; sculpture
- Notable work: Zecca, Biblioteca Marciana, Loggetta
- Movement: Renaissance

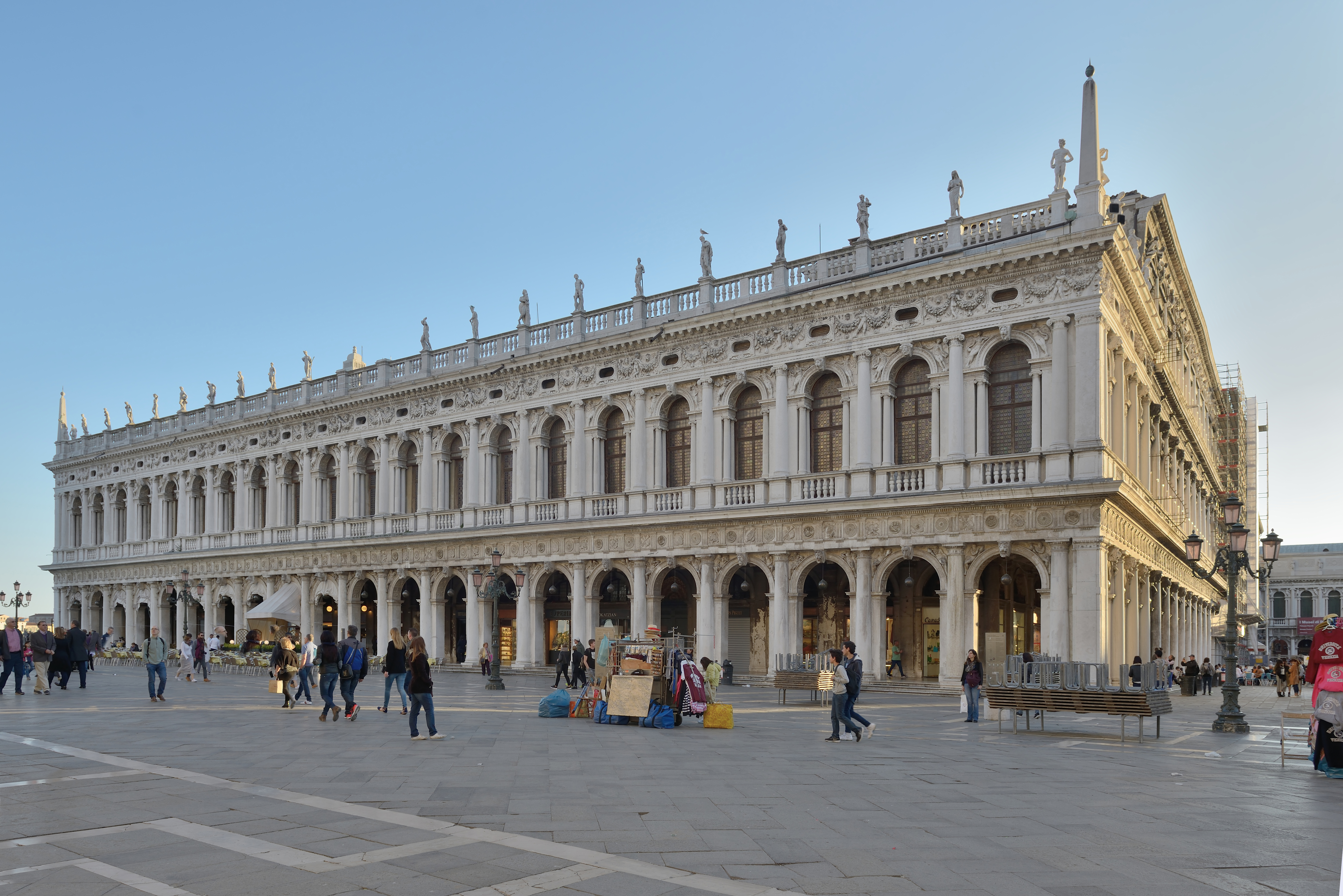
Main façade of the Biblioteca Marciana, facing the Doge's Palace

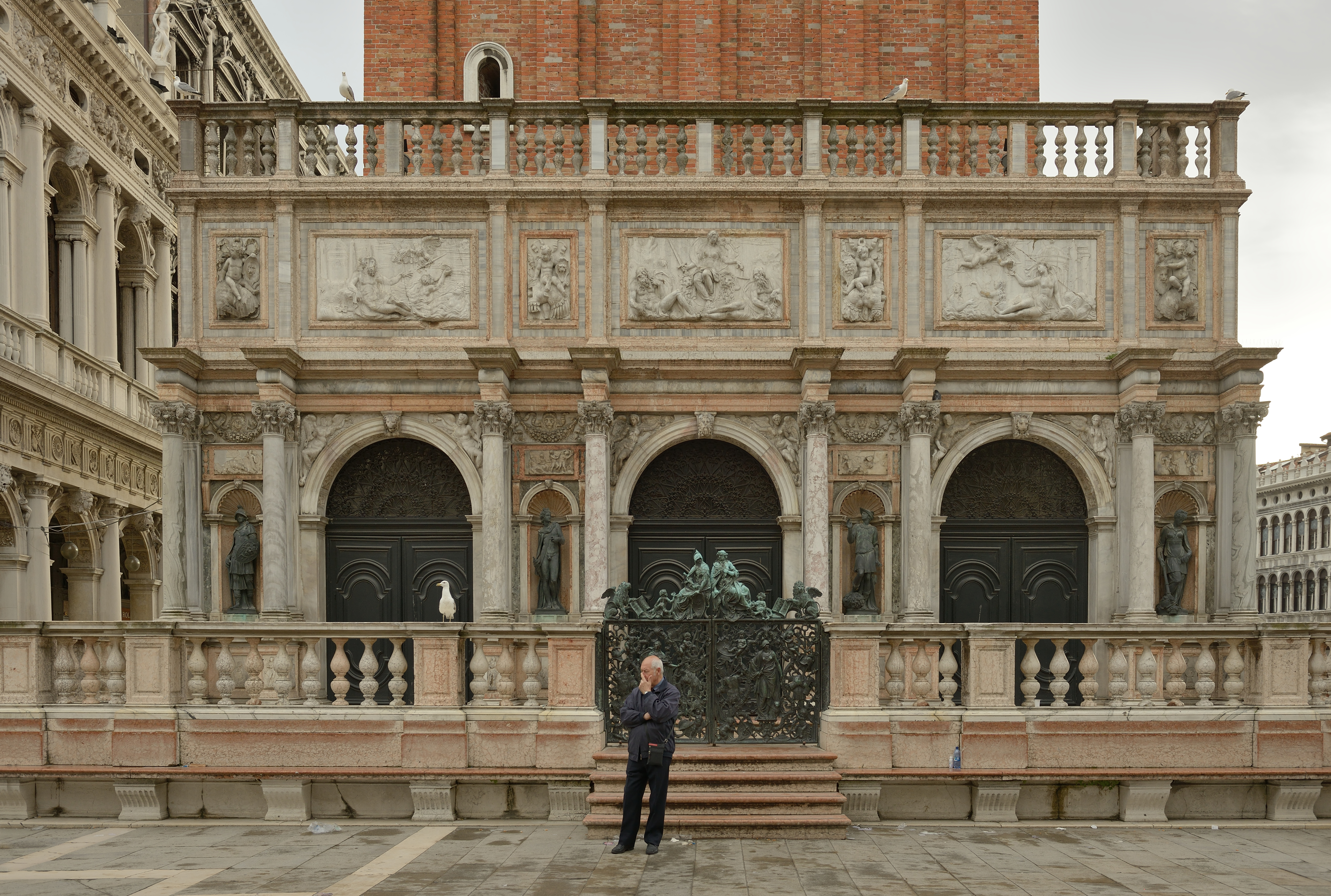
The Loggetta of Campanile di San Marco, Venice (reconstructed)

Jacopo d'Antonio Sansovino (2 July 1486 – 27 November 1570) was an Florentine sculptor and architect of the Italian Renaissance. He was active in Florence, in Rome and in the Republic of Venice, where he worked particularly around Piazza San Marco. These are crucial works in the history of Venetian Renaissance architecture. Andrea Palladio, in the Preface to his Quattro Libri was of the opinion that Sansovino's Biblioteca Marciana was the best building erected since Antiquity. Giorgio Vasari uniquely printed his Vita of Sansovino separately.

== Biography ==
Sansovino was born in Florence, Italy, as Jacopo Tatti. He apprenticed with Andrea Sansovino, whose name he subsequently adopted.

In Rome, while living in the palace of the late Cardinal Domenico della Rovere, (Note: Wolfgang Lotz states Sansovino lived in Giuliano da Sangallo's house while in Rome.) Sansovino made a wax model of the Deposition of Christ for Pietro Perugino to use. Around 1510, Sansovino was invited by Bramante, along with three other sculptors to make wax copies of the Laocoön. Raphael judged Sansovino's copy as the best.

Sansovino returned to Florence in 1511, where he received commissions for marble sculpture of St. James for the Duomo and the Bacchus, now in the Bargello. His proposals for sculpture to adorn the façade of the Church of San Lorenzo, however, were rejected by Michelangelo, who was in charge of the scheme, to whom he wrote a bitter letter of protest in 1518.

In the period of 1510–17, Sansovino shared a studio with the painter Andrea del Sarto, with whom he shared models. Like all sixteenth-century Italian architects, he devoted considerable energy to elaborate temporary structures related to courtly ceremonies and festivities. The triumphal entry of Pope Leo X into Florence in 1515 was a highpoint of this genre. Sansovino subsequently returned to Rome where he stayed for nine years, leaving for Venice in the year of the Sack of Rome (1527).

== Career ==
In 1529, Sansovino became chief architect and superintendent of properties (Protomaestro or Proto) to the Procurators of San Marco, making him one of the most influential artists in Venice. The appointment came with a salary of 80 ducats and an apartment on the south side of Piazza San Marco. Within a year his salary was raised to 180 ducats per year.

His main achievements are a group of prominent structures and buildings in central Venice found near Piazza San Marco, specifically the rusticated Zecca (public mint), the highly decorated Loggetta and its sculptures adjoining the Campanile, and various statues and reliefs for the Basilica of San Marco. He also helped rebuild a number of buildings, churches, palaces, and institutional buildings including the churches of San Zulian, San Francesco della Vigna, San Martino, San Geminiano (now destroyed), Santo Spirito in Isola, and the church of the Ospedale degli Incurabili. Among palaces and buildings are the Scuola Grande della Misericordia (early plans), Ca' de Dio, Palazzo Dolfin Manin, Palazzo Corner, Palazzo Moro, and the Fabbriche Nuove di Rialto.

His masterpiece is the Library of Saint Mark's, the Biblioteca Marciana, one of Venice's most richly decorated Renaissance structures, which stands in front of the Doge's palace, across the piazzetta. Construction spanned fifty years and cost over 30,000 ducats. In it he successfully made the architectural language of classicism, traditionally associated with severity and restraint, palatable to the Venetians with their love of surface decoration. This paved the way for the graceful architecture of Andrea Palladio.

He died in Venice and his tomb is in the Baptistery of St. Mark's Basilica. His most important follower in the medium of sculpture was Alessandro Vittoria; another disciple was the architect and sculptor Danese Cattaneo.

== Gallery ==
Archtecture

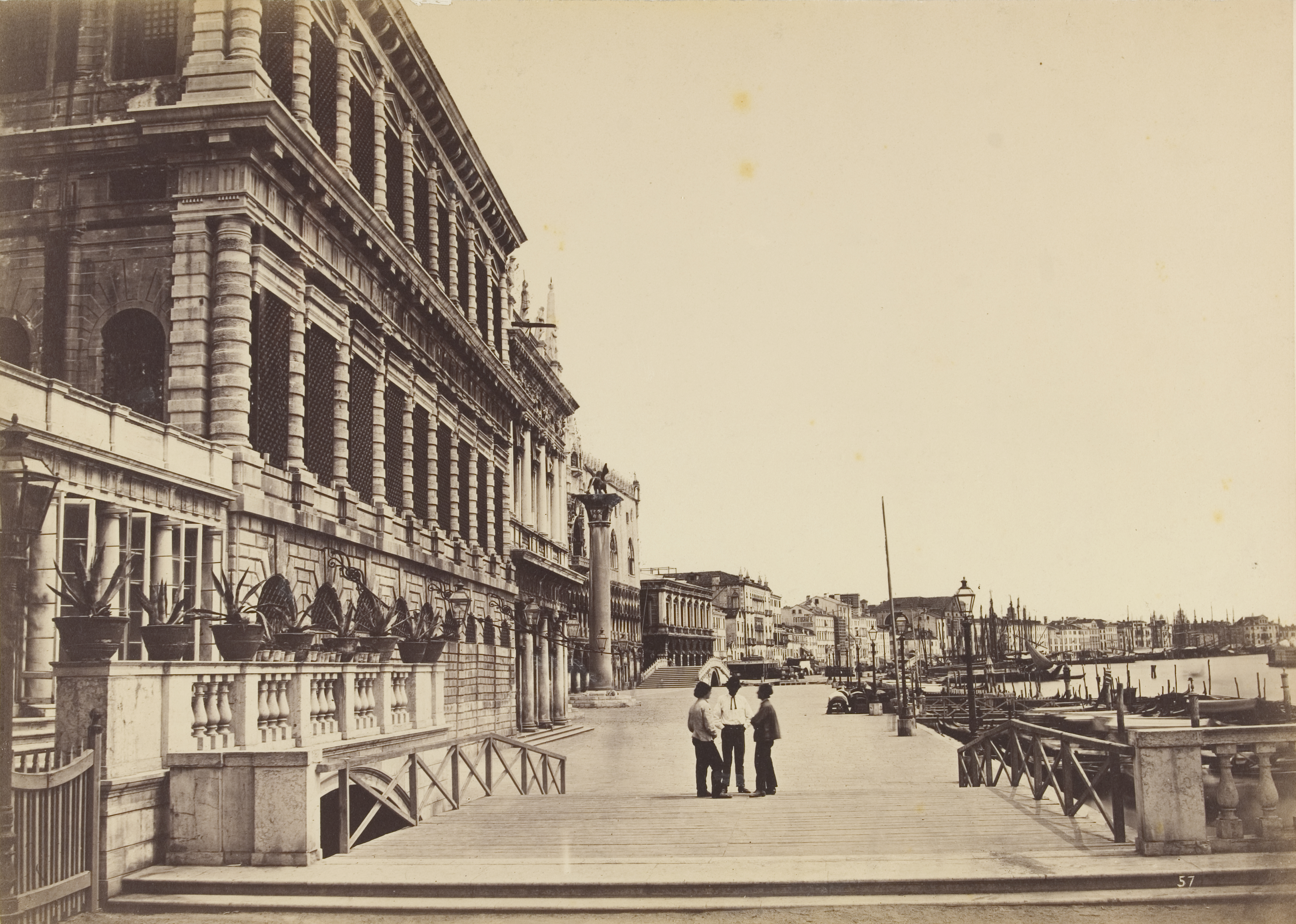
The five shops and the Zecca
Sculptures

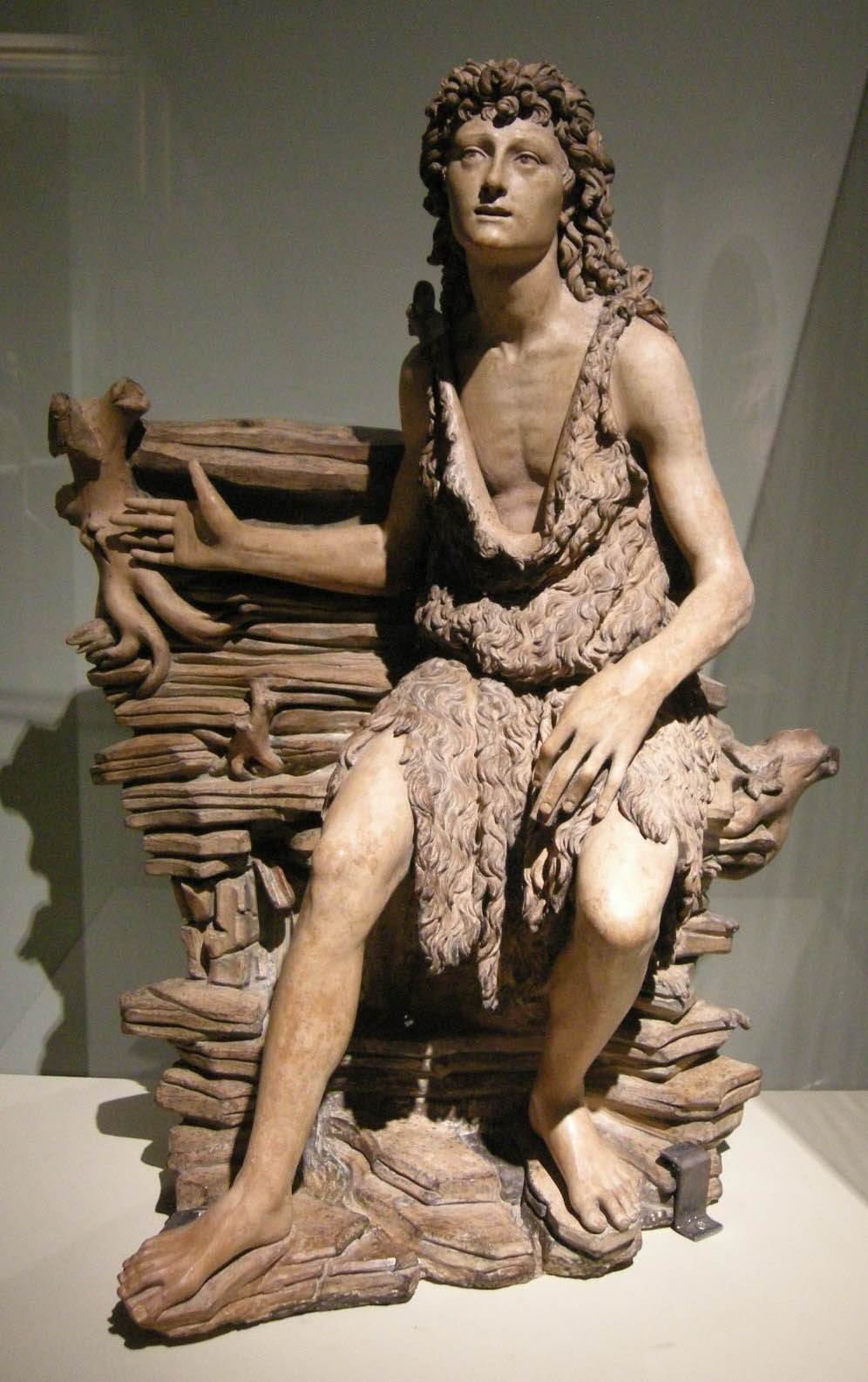
(Attributed), St. John of the Desert, 1505–07

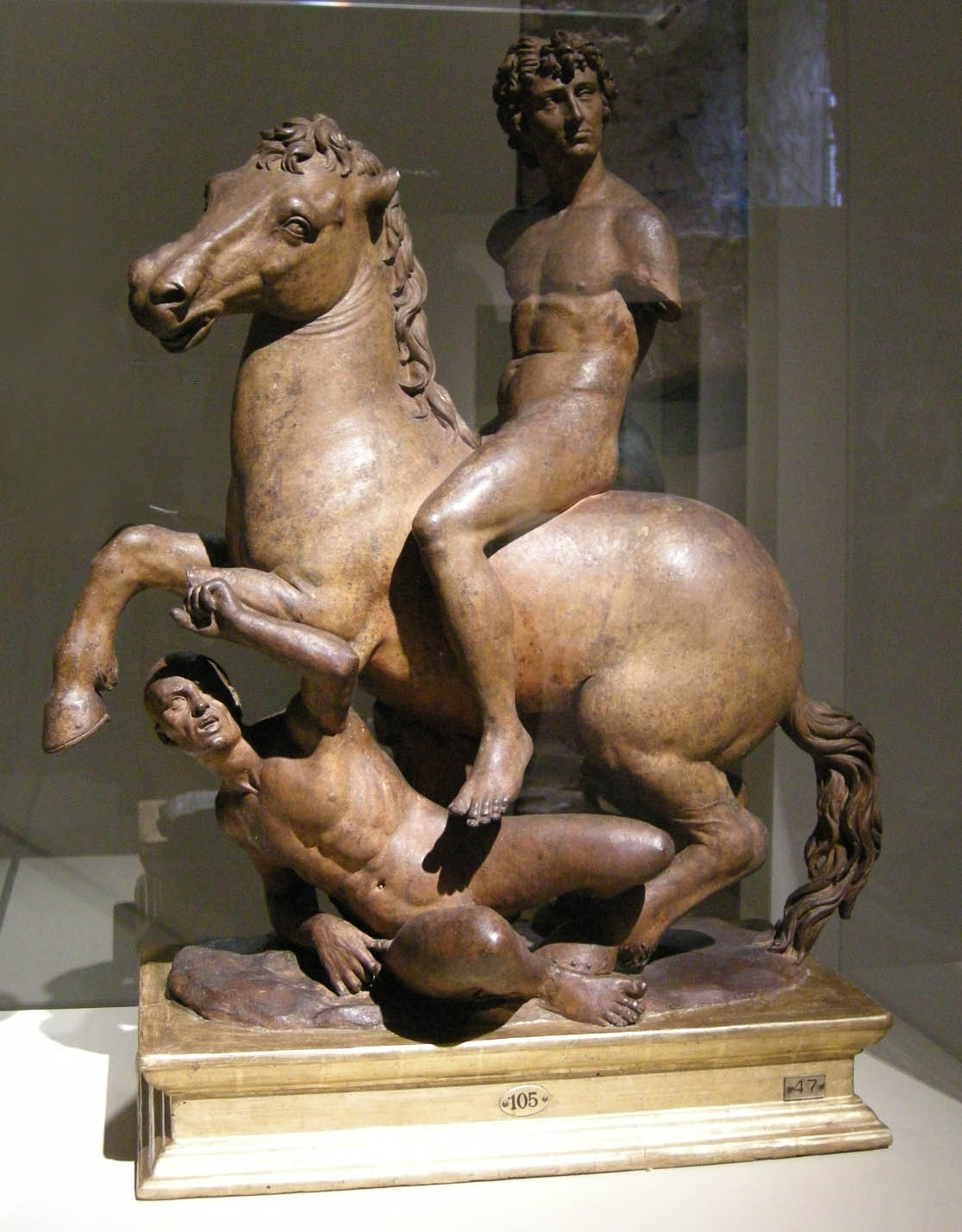
(Attributed), Knight Trampling on a Vanquished, c. 1506–10, Museo Horne, Florence

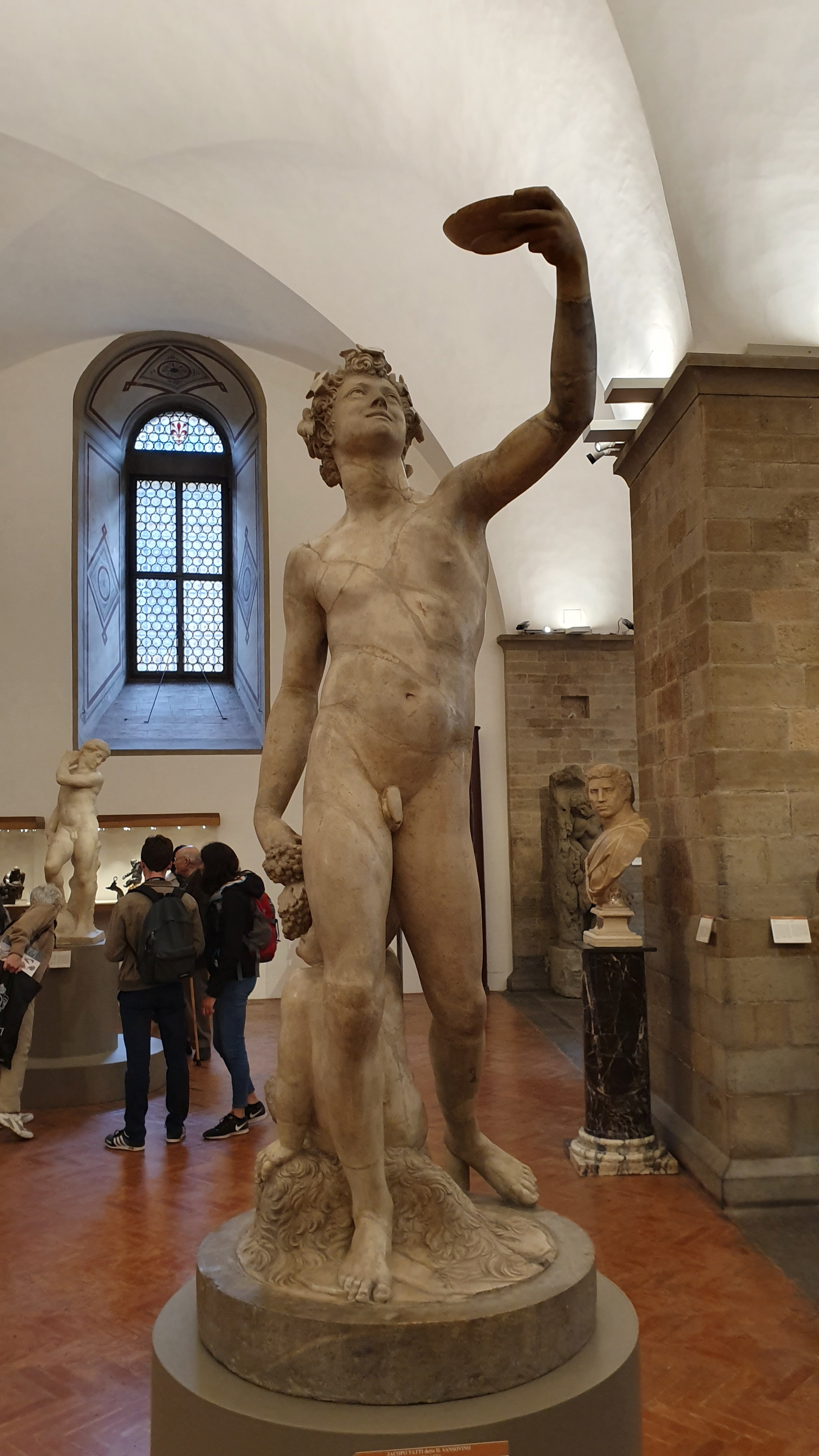
Bacchus, 1515, Bargello, Florence

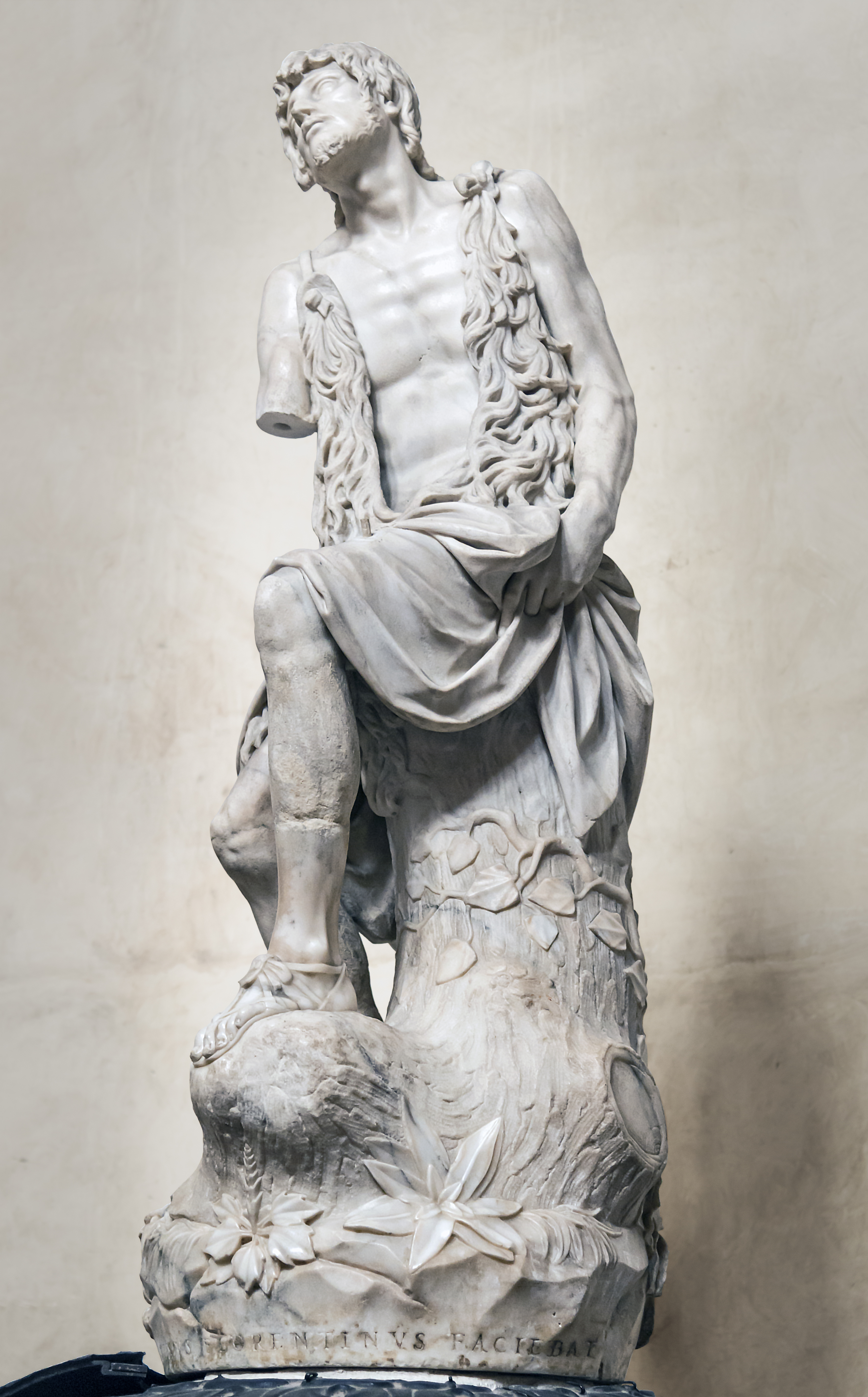
St. John the Baptist, 1540, Frari Church, Venice

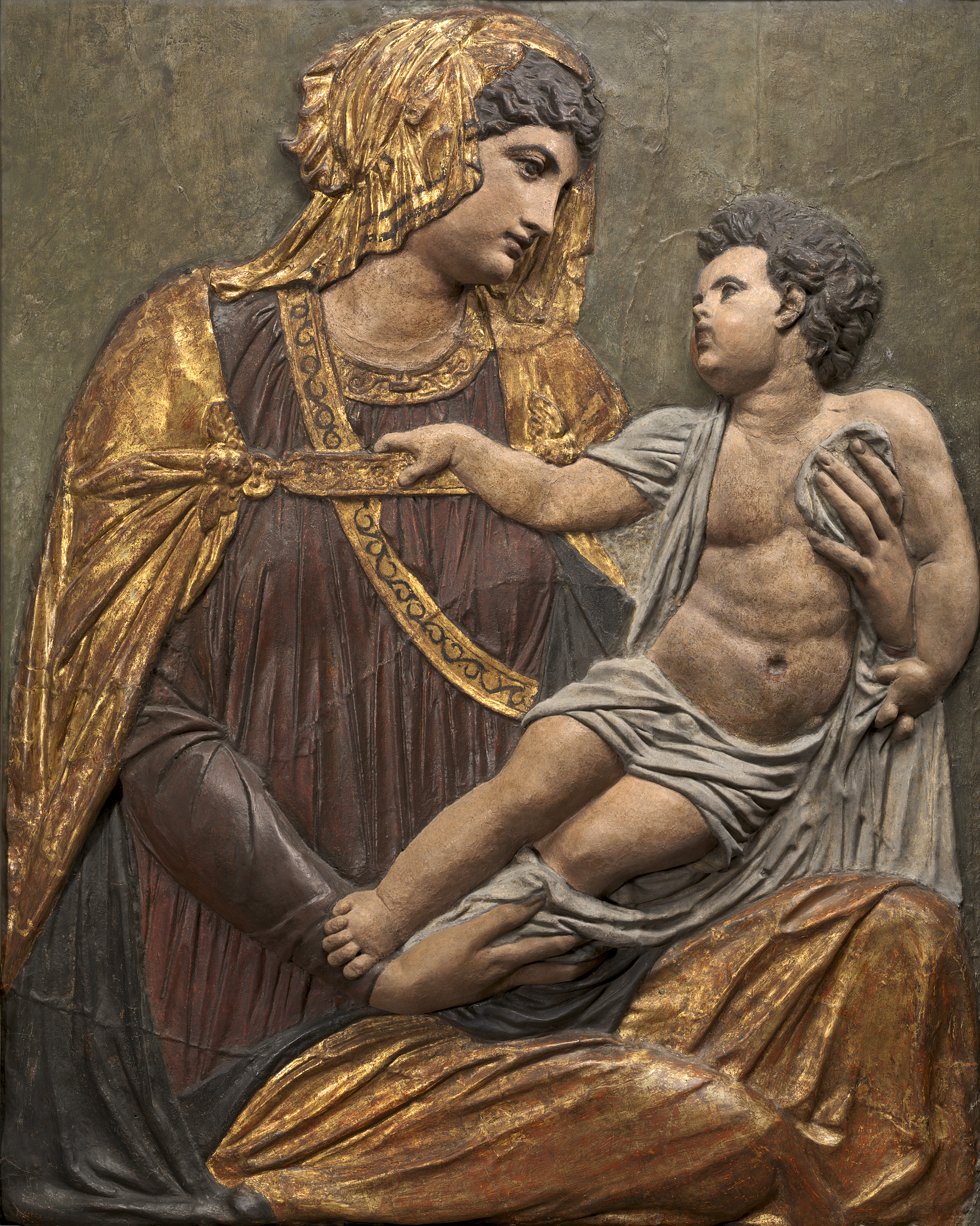
Madonna and Child, c. 1550, National Gallery of Art, Washington

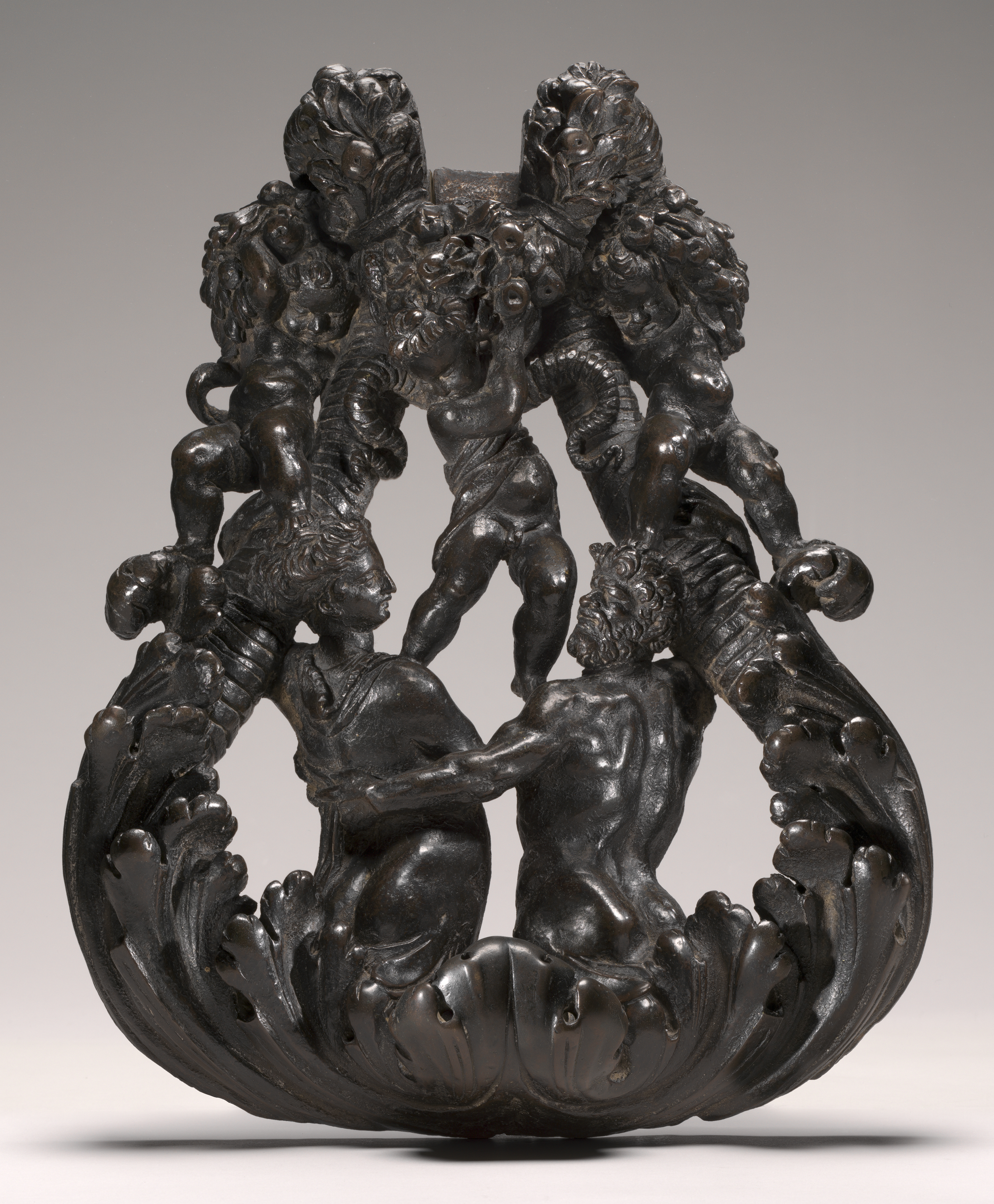
Door Knocker with Nereid, Triton, and Putti, c. 1550, National Gallery of Art

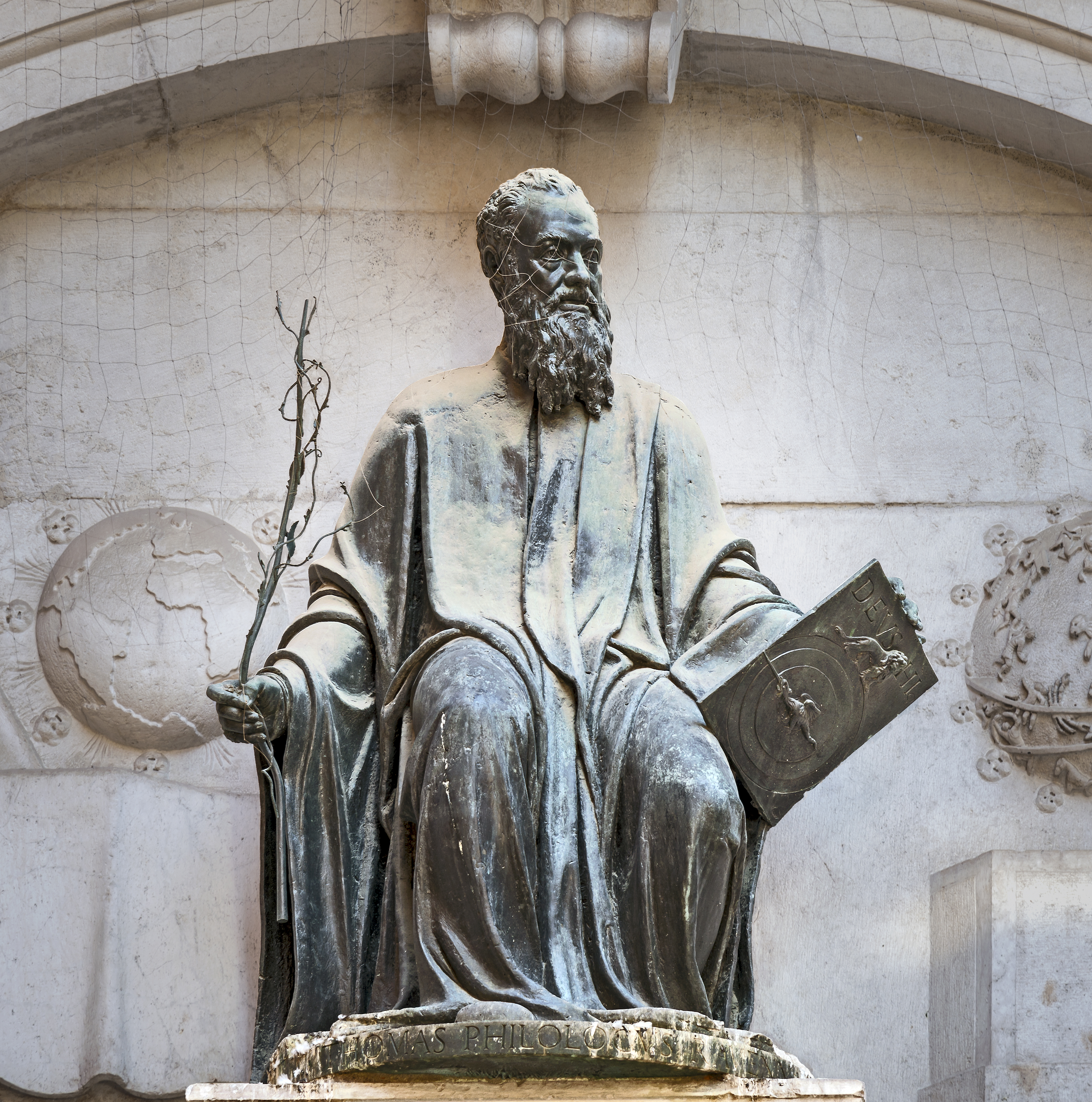
Statue of Thomas Rangone, 1554, San Zulian, Venice

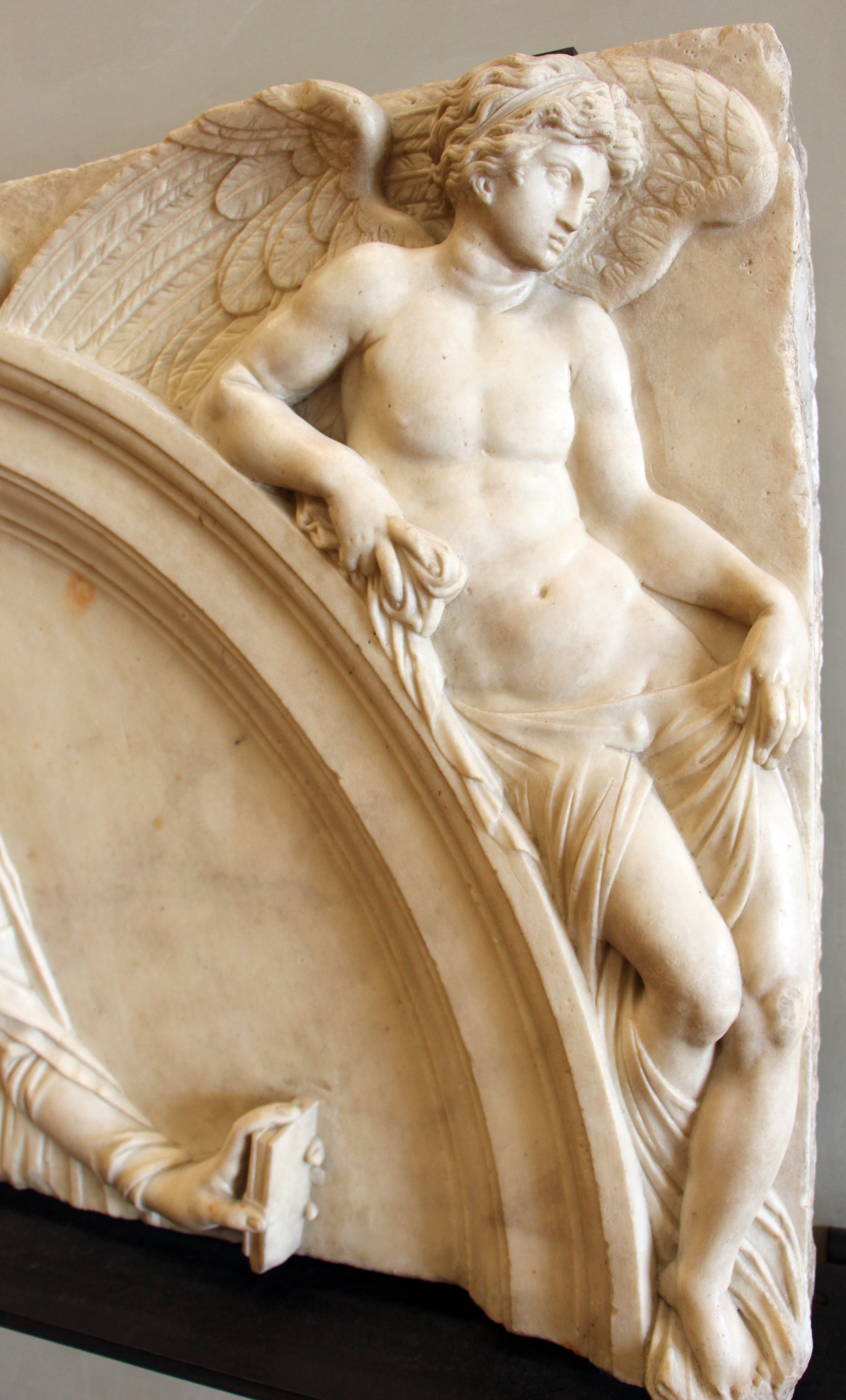
Madonna and Child with Angels (detail), 1560, Ca' d'Oro, Venice

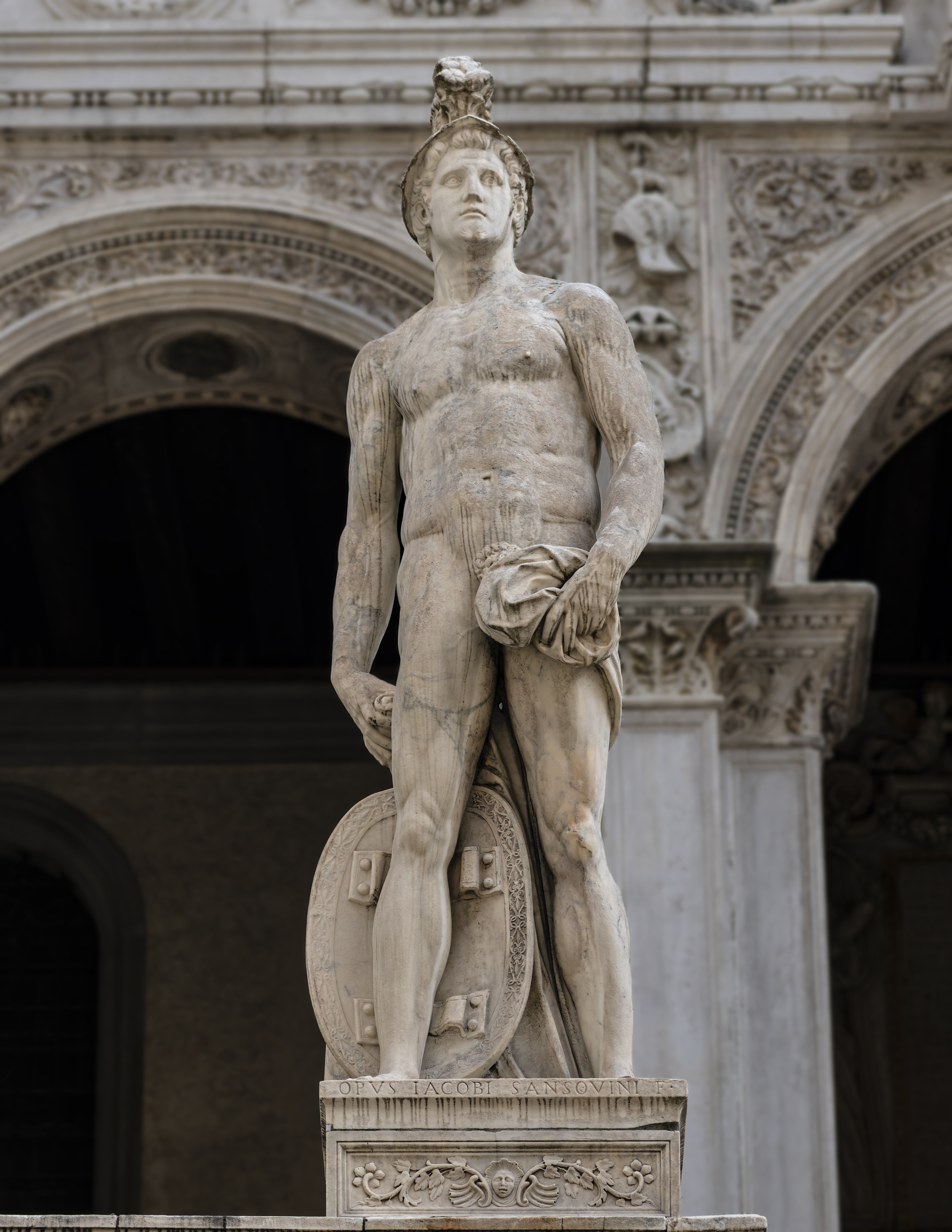
Mars, 1567, Scala dei Giganti, Doge's Palace, Venice

Neptune, 1567, Scala dei Giganti

== See also ==
- Renaissance Classicism

== Sources ==
- Brooks, Julian; Allen, Denise; Salomon, Xavier F. (2015). Andrea del Sarto: The Renaissance Workshop in Action. Getty Publications.
- Coonin, Arnold Victor (2003). "The Interaction of Painting and Sculpture in the Art of Perugino". Artibus et Historiae. 24 (47): 103–120. doi:10.2307/1483762. JSTOR 1483762.
- Franzoni, Claudio (2010). "Raphael". In Grafton, Anthony; Most, Glenn W.; Settis, Salvatore (eds.). The Classical Tradition. Harvard University Press. pp. 802–806.
- Howard, Deborah. Jacopo Sansovino Architecture and Patronage in Renaissance Venice. New Haven/London: Yale University Press, 1975, ISBN 0-300-01891-6 (online).
- Lotz, Wolfgang (1995). Architecture in Italy, 1500–1600. New Haven: Yale University Press.
- Parker, Deborah (2010). Michelangelo and the Art of Letter Writing. Cambridge University Press.
- Pope-Hennessy, John (1963). Italian High Renaissance and Baroque Sculpture. London: Phaidon.
- Tafuri, Manfredo (2006). Interpreting the Renaissance: Princes, Cities, Architects. New Haven: Yale University Press.

=== Further reading ===
- Boucher, Bruce. The Sculpture of Jacopo Sansovino. 2 vols. New Haven: Yale University Press, 1991. Monograph and catalogue raisonné of the sculpture.
- Tafuri, Manfredo (Jessica Levine, translator). Venice and the Renaissance. Cambridge MA: MIT Press, 1989 [1985]. Sansovino's cultural context.
- Jacopo Sansovino | Italian sculptor | Britannica
- Hart, Vaughan, Hicks, Peter, Sansovino's Venice New Haven: Yale University Press, 2017.
