= Giorgio Spavento =

Italian architect (died 1509)

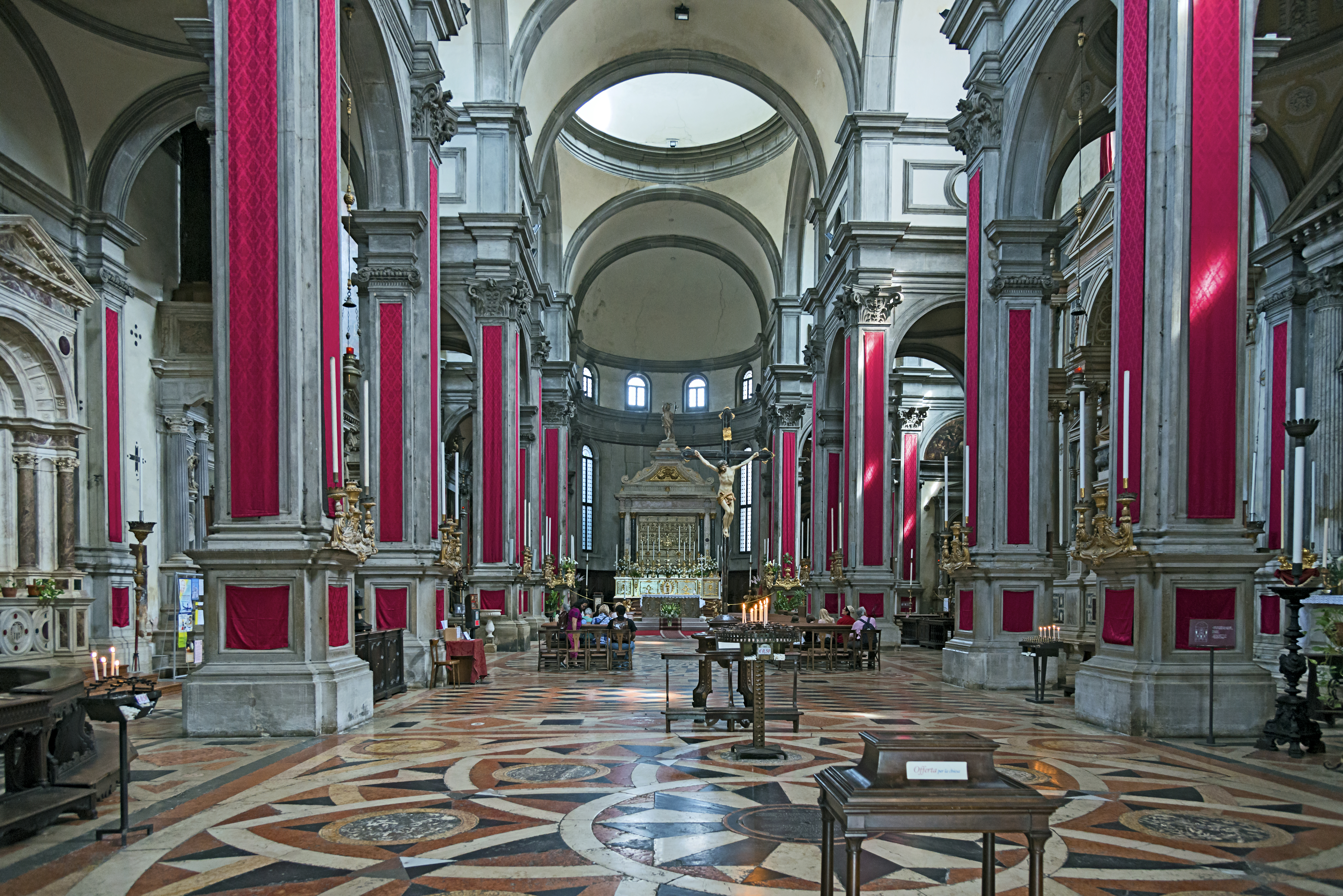
Interior of the Church of San Salvador, designed by Giorgio Spavento

Giorgio Spavento (died 17 April 1509) was an Italian Renaissance architect and engineer, active in Venice. Probably native to the area of Lake Como, he is first recorded in 1486 when he was appointed as proto (consultant architect and buildings manager) to the Procurators of Saint Mark. As such, he was responsible for most of the public buildings around Saint Mark's Square. He designed the sacristy of the Church of St Mark, the belfry of St Mark's campanile, and the Church of San Teodoro. His principal work is the Church of San Salvador, which was completed by Tullio Lombardo and Jacopo Sansovino.

== See also ==
- Venetian Renaissance architecture

== Bibliography ==
- Howard, Deborah, The Architectural History of Venice (London: B. T. Batsford, 1980) ISBN 9780300090291
- Howard, Deborah, 'Giorgio Spavento', in The Dictionary of Art, 34 vols (London: Macmillan, 1996) XXIX, pp. 369–370 OCLC 1126390761
- McAndrew, John, Venetian architecture of the early Renaissance (Cambridge, MA: MIT Press, 1980) ISBN 9780262131575
