= San Francesco della Vigna =

Roman Catholic church in Venice, Italy

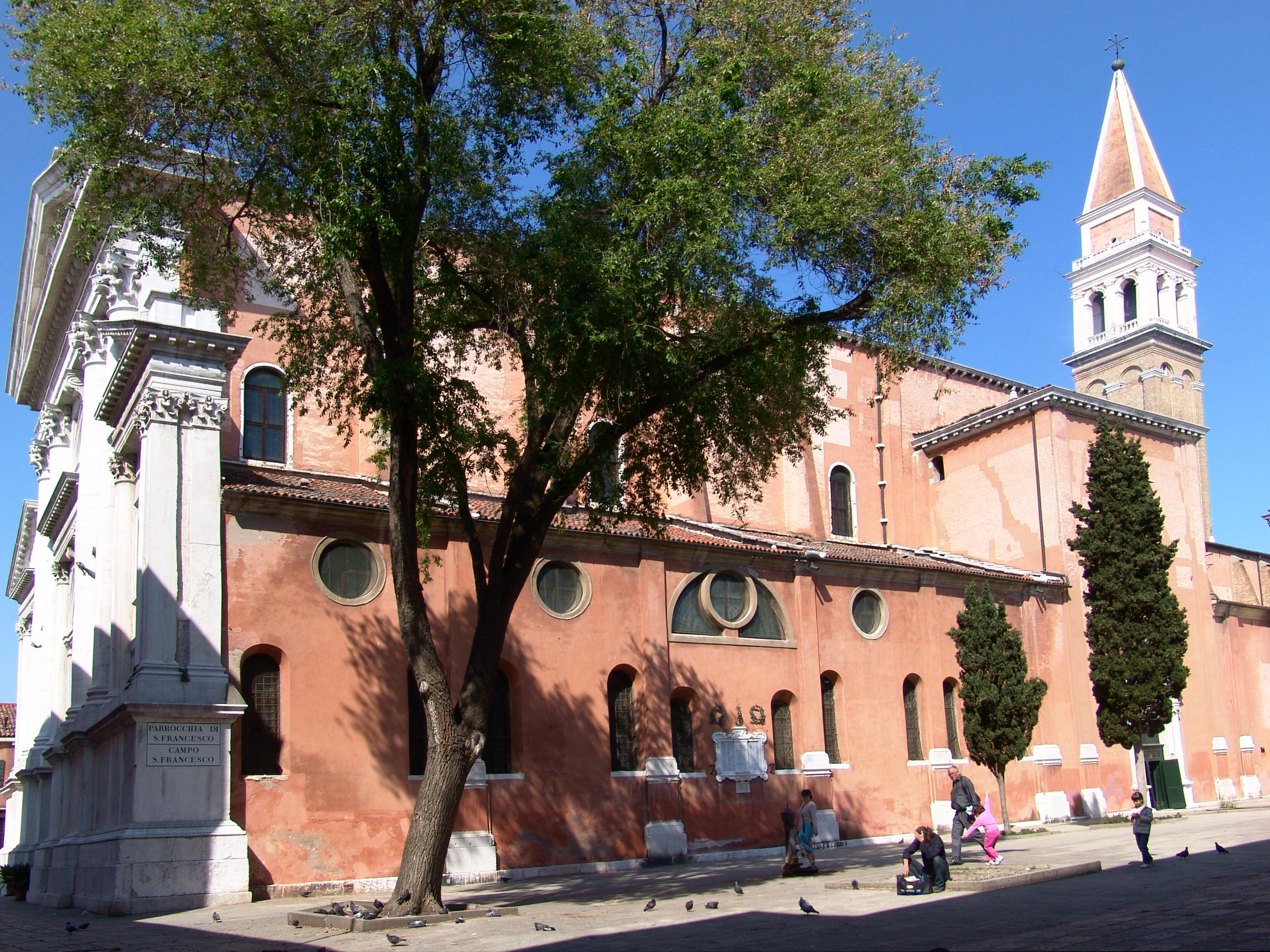
- The Church of San Francesco della Vigna

- Location within Venice Location within Italy

Religion
- Affiliation: Roman Catholic
- Province: Venice

Location
- Location: Venice, Italy
- Coordinates: 45.4381°N 12.3486°E

Architecture
- Style: Gothic
- Spire height: 70 metres (230 ft)

San Francesco della Vigna is a Roman Catholic church in the Sestiere of Castello in Venice, northern Italy.

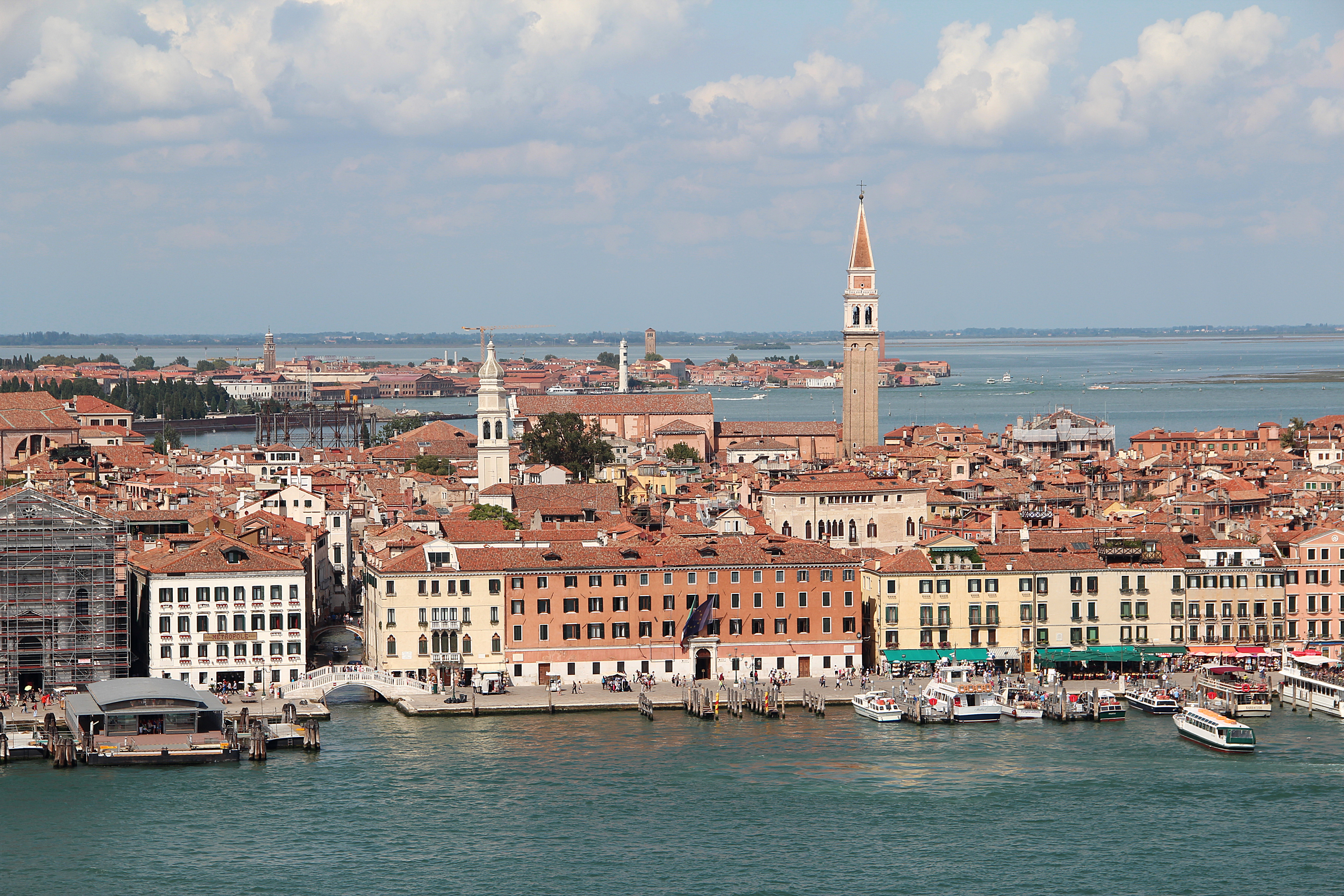
San Franceso della Vigna seen from the bell tower of San Giorgio Maggiore

== History ==
Along with Santa Maria Gloriosa dei Frari, this is one of two Franciscan churches in Venice. The site, originally a vineyard (vigna), was donated by Marco Ziani in 1253 for construction of the monastery. A tiny chapel already on the site recalled the spot where an angel supposedly had pronounced Pax tibi Marce, evangelista meus to the shipwrecked Saint Mark, patron of Venice.

The first church at the site was a triple-nave Gothic church by Marino da Pisa. A monastery housed the Frati Minori dell'Osservanza, while the Conventuali occupied the Frari across town. By the 16th century, the church building was in need of repair. Two main impulses led to the reconstruction of this church; one was the reform sweeping the order of the Franciscan Observants, and the other was the wishes of Doge Andrea Gritti, whose family palace neighboured the church. In 1534, this Doge laid the foundation stone for the new church. The nave was roofed over by 1554.

== Exterior ==
The church was designed in sober Renaissance style by Jacopo Sansovino in 1554, with the advice of the Franciscan friar, Fra Francesco Zorzi. Fra Zorzi based the sizing of the various elements on the number three, because of its association with the Trinity: the nave should be nine paces wide and 27 paces long, each side chapel three paces wide. However, the white marble façade (1564-1570) was not based on Sansovino's design, but on Andrea Palladio's instead. It is thought that the patrician Daniele Barbaro lobbied for the commission to be switched by Giovanni Grimani from Sansovino to Palladio in 1562. Palladio addressed the challenge of linking the central nave with the side aisles in the façade in an innovative manner. The Corinthian columns in both the center and the sides are perched on the same high plinth, though the central four columns are taller and wider than the lateral ones. The lateral columns support half-pediments that mimic the angle of the central full pediment. Above the central portal is a hemicircular window, interrupted superiorly by a bracket and subdivided into three parts. The façade contains two large bronze statues of Moses and Saint Paul (1592), actively stepping forward from their shallow niches, sculpted by Tiziano Aspetti.

At the top of the tympanum, an eagle unfolds a banner stating Renovabitur (It will be renewed). Below, a frieze dedication of the church states: Deo utriusque templi aedificatori ac reparatori (God, builder and restorer of both temples) is engraved. Four marble plaques state: Accede ad hoc / ne deseras spirituale / non sine iugi exteriori / interiorique bello (Enter here / not abandoning the spirit / nor without external yoke / and internal conflict). Inside the church, each chapel was sold for 200-350 ducats to aristocratic donors, raising much needed construction funds, granting the rights to place their coat-of-arms in the chapel and to bury their family there. For the right to be buried in the floor of the chancel in front of the high altar, Doge Andrea Gritti paid 1000 ducats. In 1542, Vettor Grimani and his brother Cardinal Marino acquired rights to build the facade for the church. The three sarcophagi for two cardinals and a patriarch from the Grimani family are no longer in place. The facade of the church was ultimately commissioned from Andrea Palladio (1562) by Giovanni Grimani.

In the 1950s were cast the 5 bells in B rung with the Veronese bellringing art.

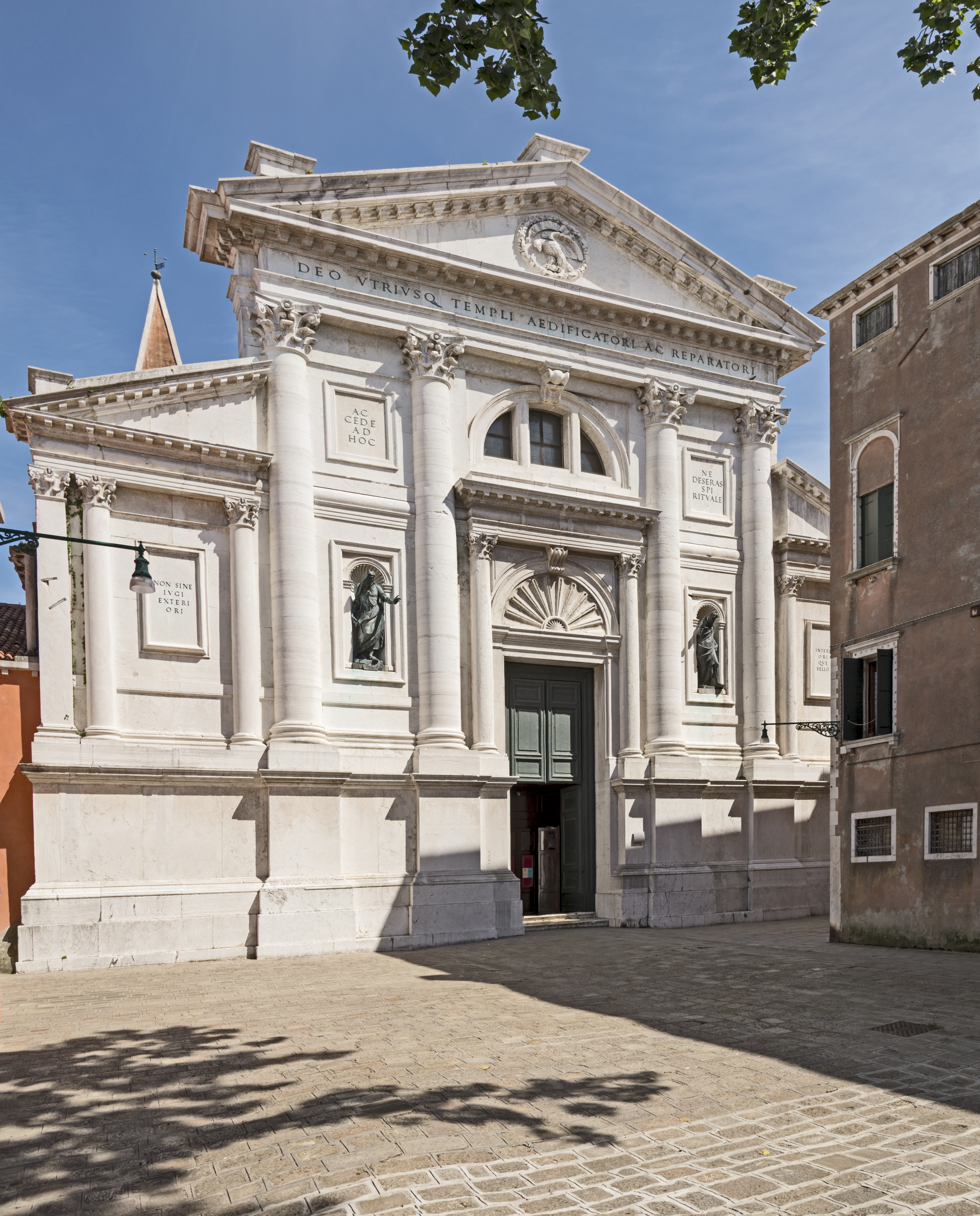
Façade by Palladio

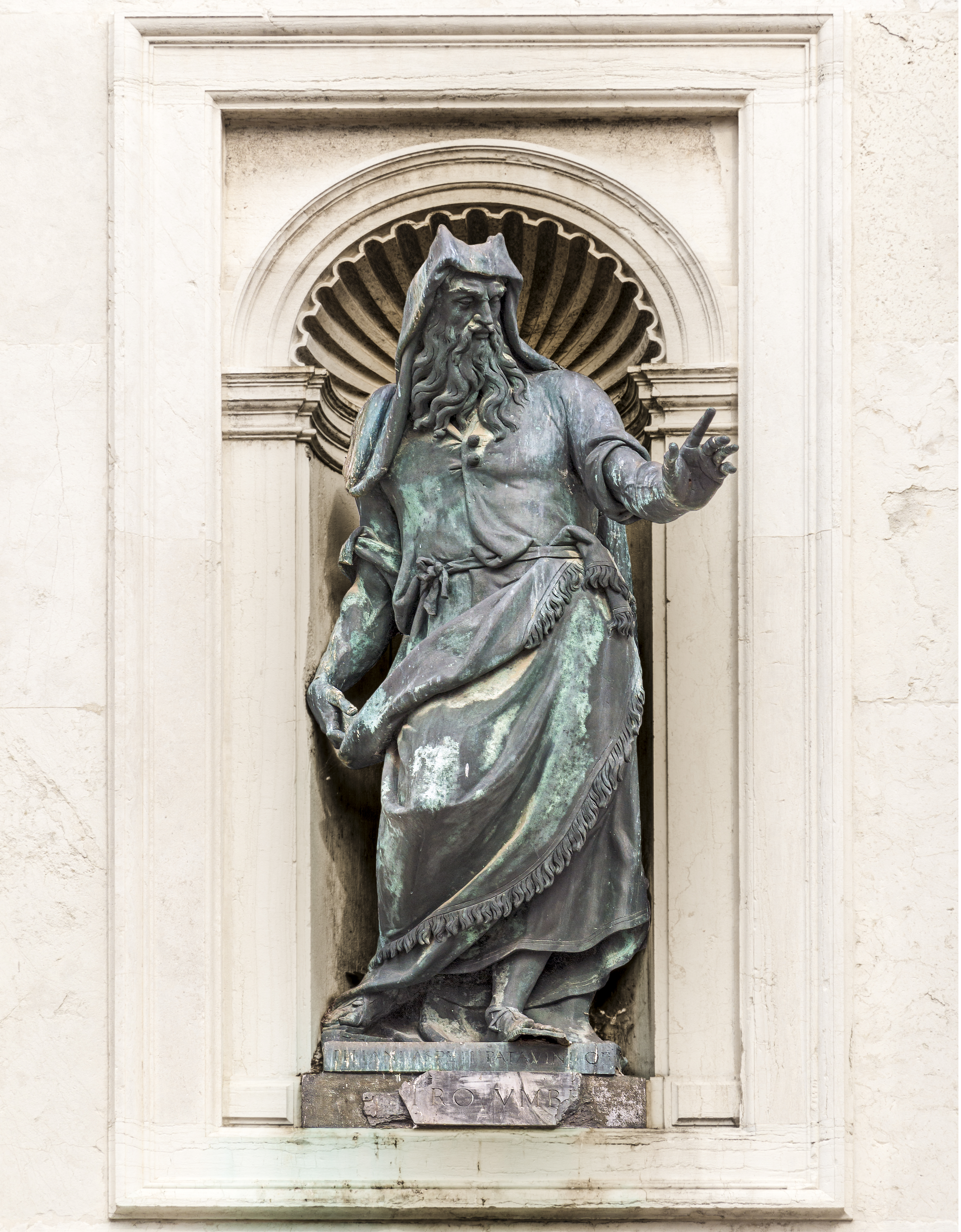
Moses by Tiziano Aspetti

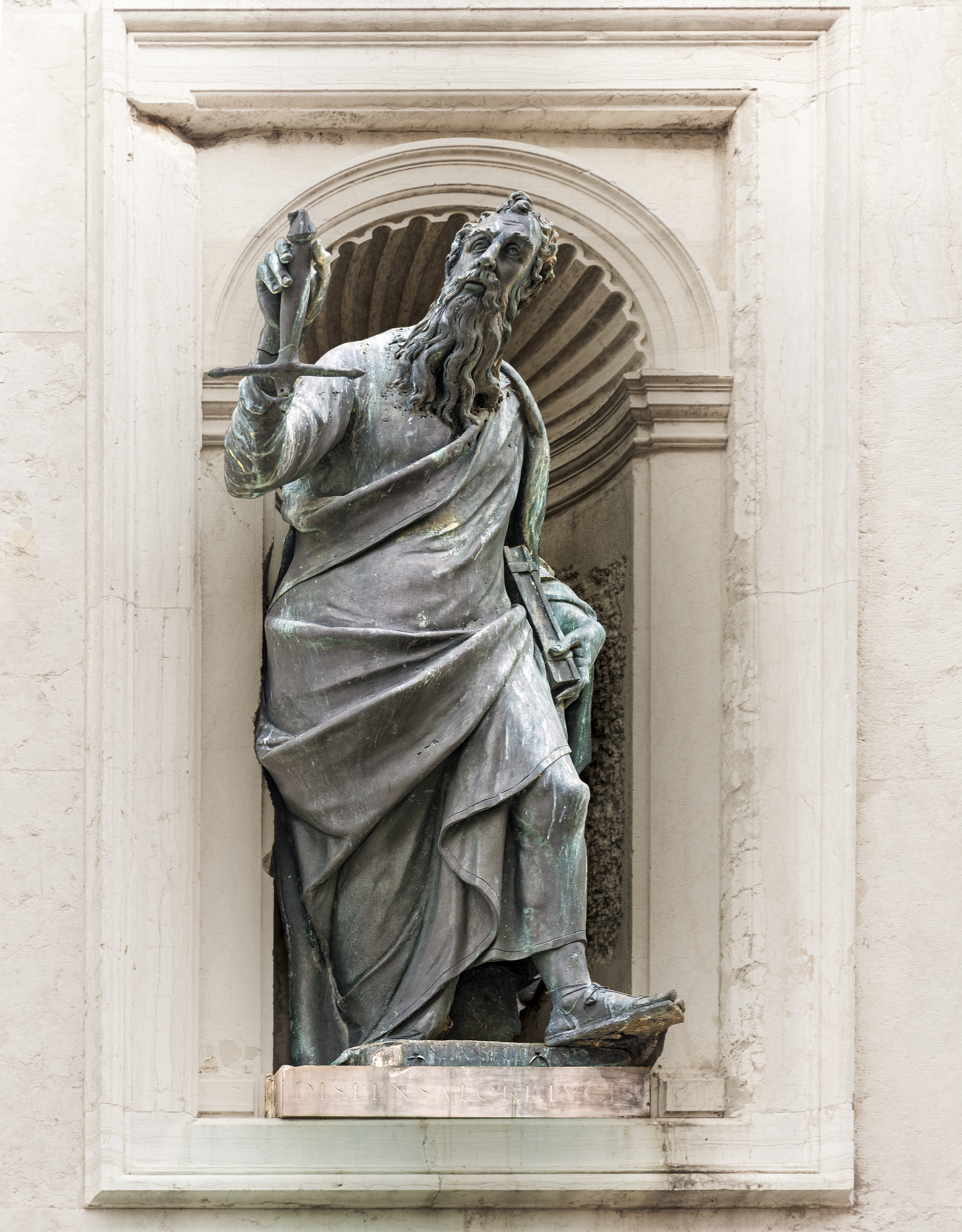
Saint Paul by Tiziano Aspetti

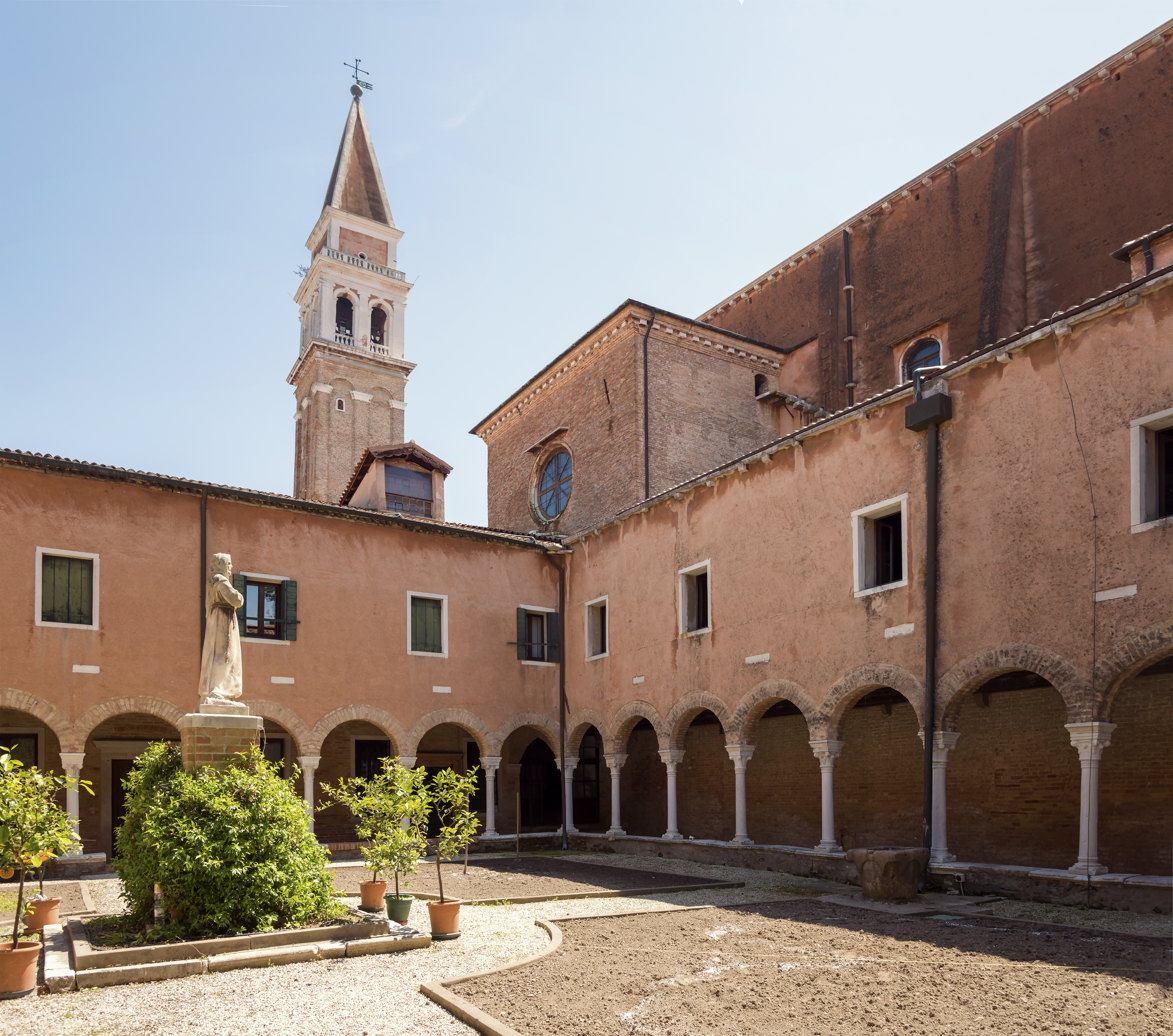
Cloister

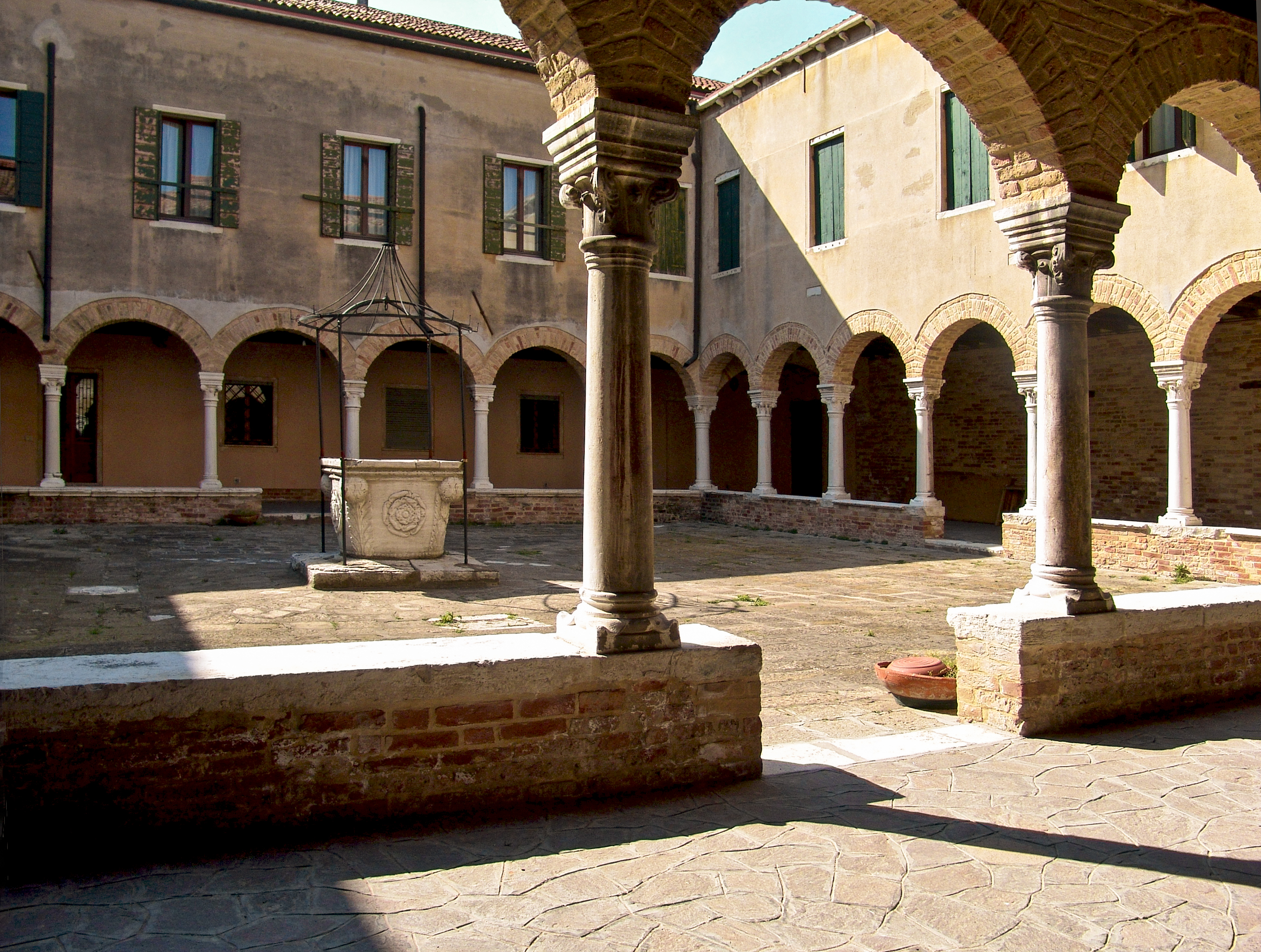
Cloister (second)

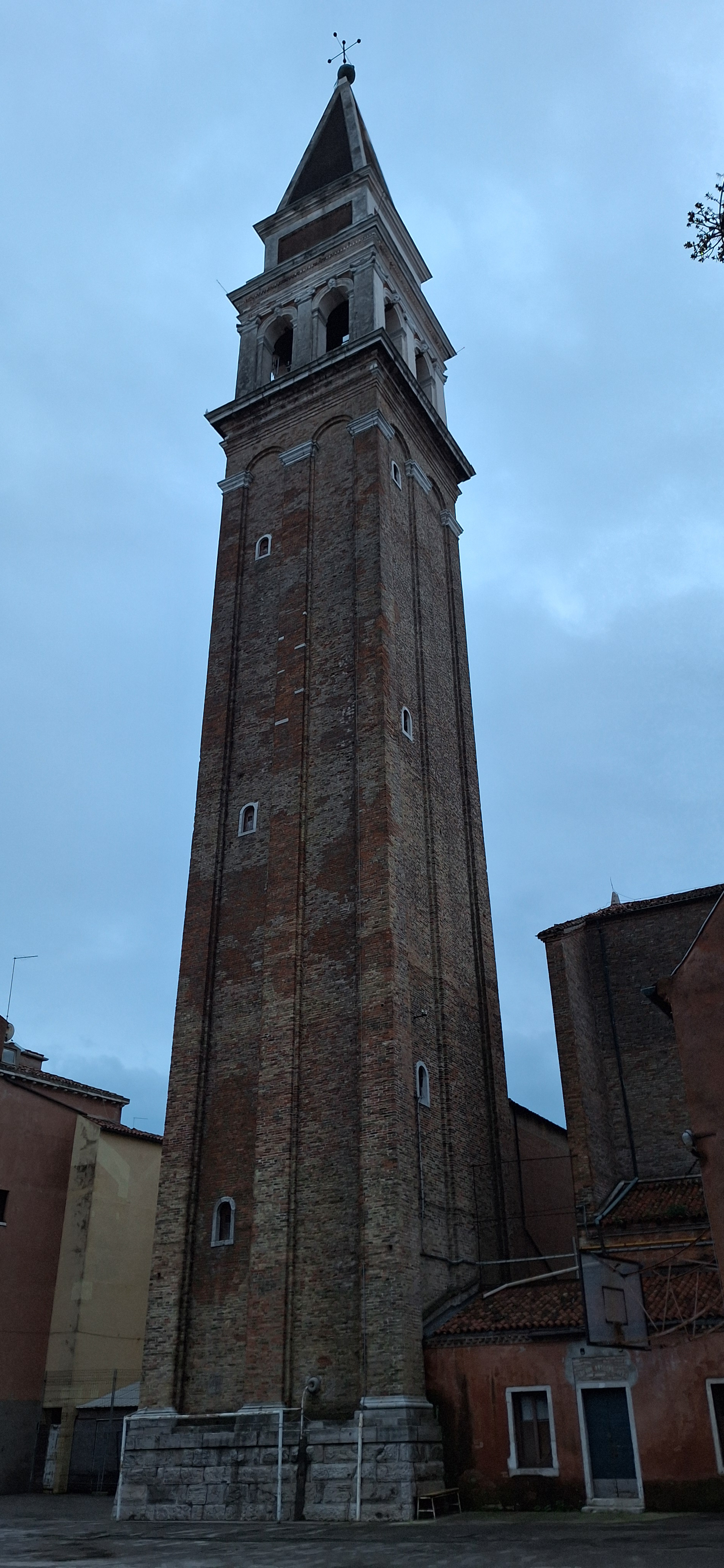
Campanile San Francesco della Vignia

== Interior ==
The interior of the church has a simplicity and severity befitting a Franciscan church, with plain Istrian stone Doric pilasters. The choir, which in the past was occupied by the monks during services, is behind the altar. The interior contains an alabaster sculpture of St. Louis of Toulouse and an early 15th-century Gothic painting of the Madonna of humility.

The Grimani chapel (first in the left aisle) is decorated with ceiling paintings by Battista Franco, and murals and altarpiece by Federico Zuccari. The chapel has been restored by the British charity Venice in Peril, which also restored Palladio's facade in the 1990s.

The chapels of the church house masterpieces that both were made for this church or were moved here mainly in the 19th century from shuttering churches, oratories, and monasteries. They belong to some of the most prominent aristocratic families in Venice. Among the chapels, and works therein, are the following (starting from the entrance):

=== Right ===
1st, Bragadin or of St Catherine of Alexandria
First chapel on the right, dedicated to the Bragadin family, and patronized by Saint Catherine of Alexandria. The chapel was acquired in 1537 by Girolamo Bragadin, Procurator Procurator of St. Mark, the coat of arms of the Bragadin family are placed on either side of the altar. The painting of the altarpiece depicts Catherine of Alexandria with Saints Jerome, John the Baptist, and the Apostle James (Middle of the 16th century) by Giuseppe Porta.

On the right, a painting depicting "the Last Supper" by Francesco Rizzo da Santacroce. On the left, the "Resurrection of Christ" by Giovanni da Asola. In the middle of the chapel, the tombstone of Bragadin Girolamo Bragadin (1545).

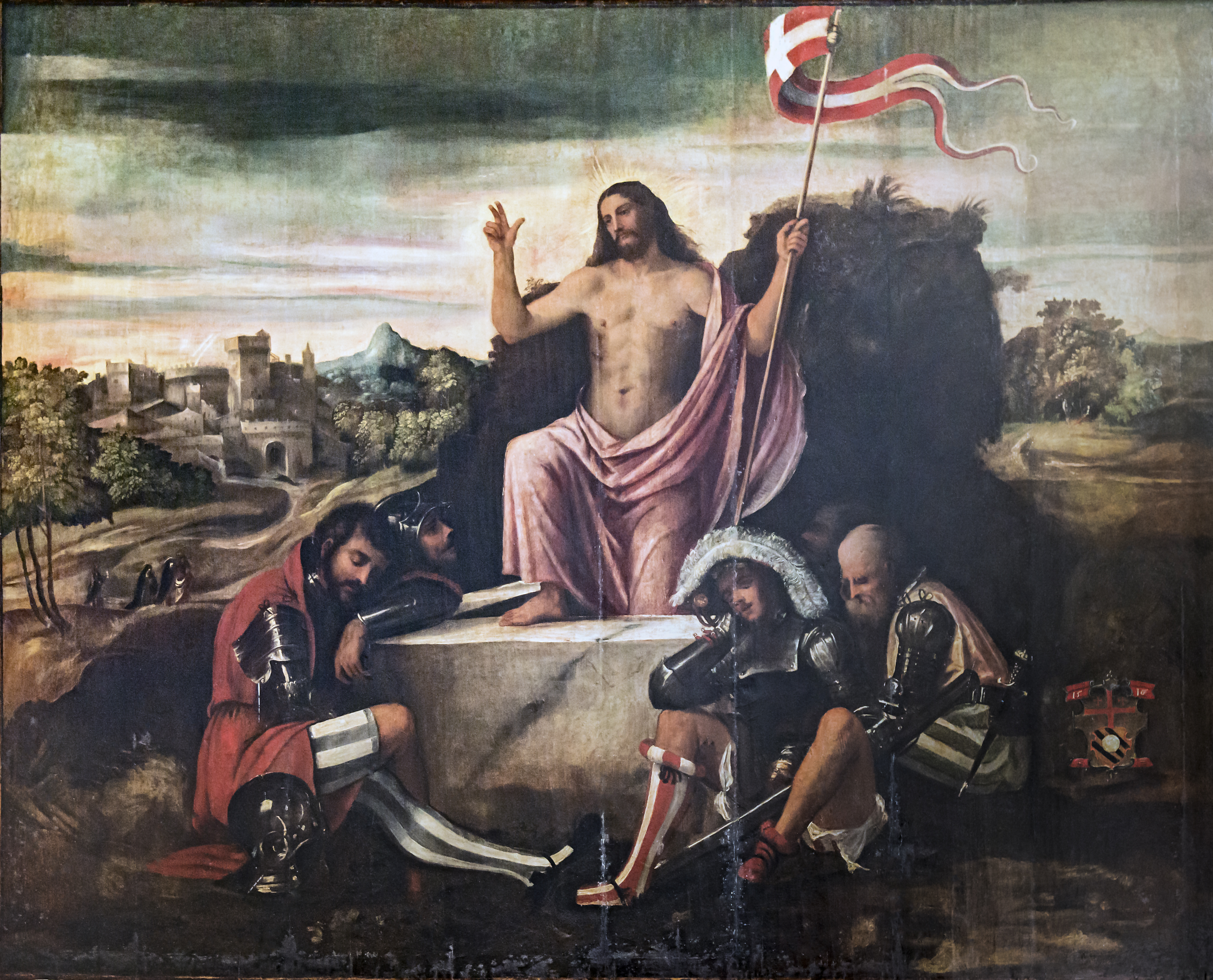
"Resurrection of Christ" by Giovanni da Asola

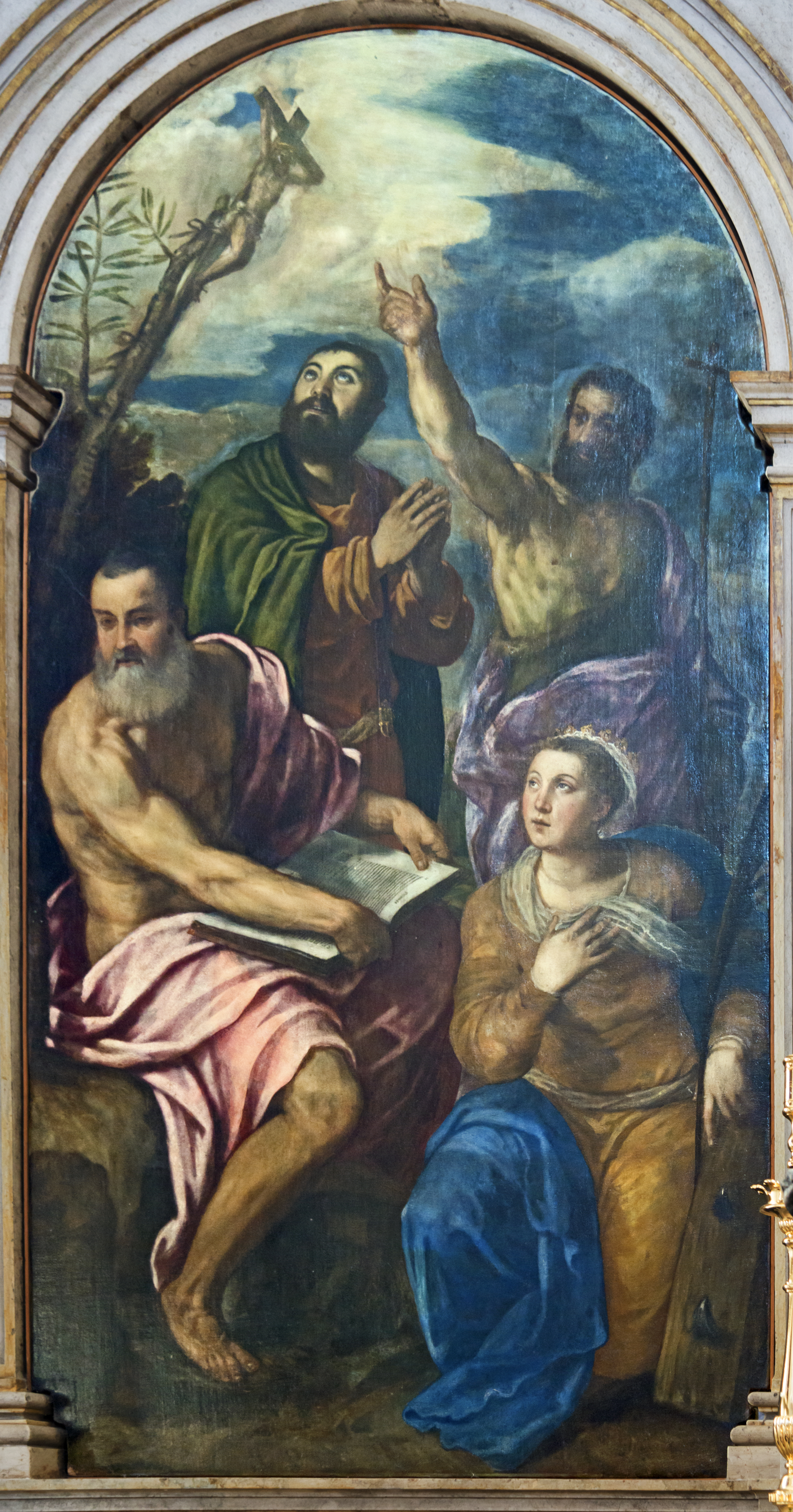
Catherine of Alexandria with Saints Jerome, John the Baptist, and James Giuseppe Porta

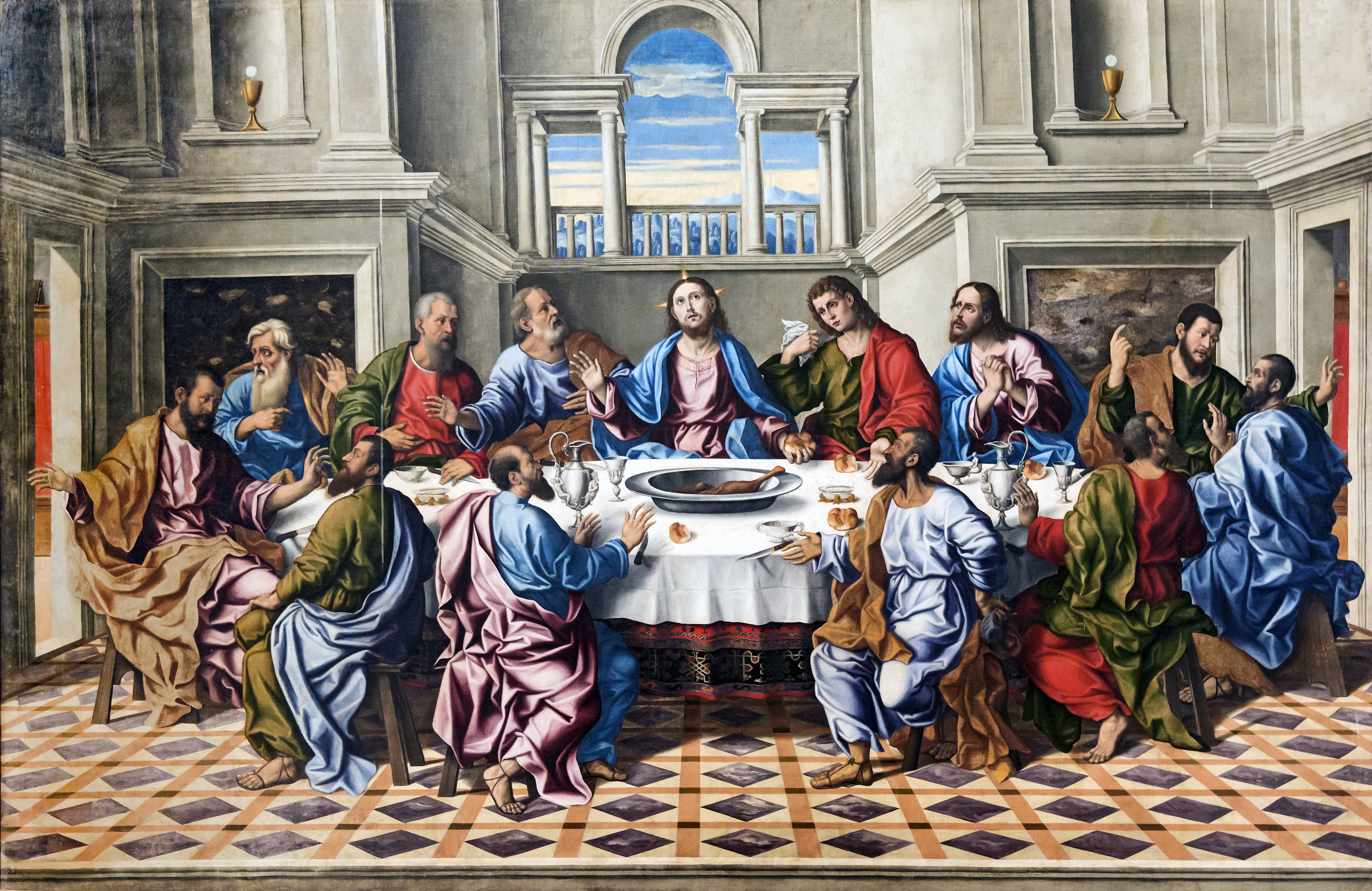
"the Last Supper" by Francesco Rizzo da Santacroce

2nd, Badoer-Surian or of the Immaculate Conception
The chapel was dedicated in 1535 to the Virgin by Piero Badoer, Procurator of San Marco. It also contains the tombs (1563) of Surian family. The chapel has four flanking 18th-century canvases, originally from the Oratory of the Stimmate, depicting on the right the Sacrifice of Isaac by Pittoni and Rebecca at the Well with Eleazar by Nicola Grassi; and on the left, the Samaritan at the Well by Francesco Polazzo and the Healing the Congenitally Blind by Angelo Trevisani.

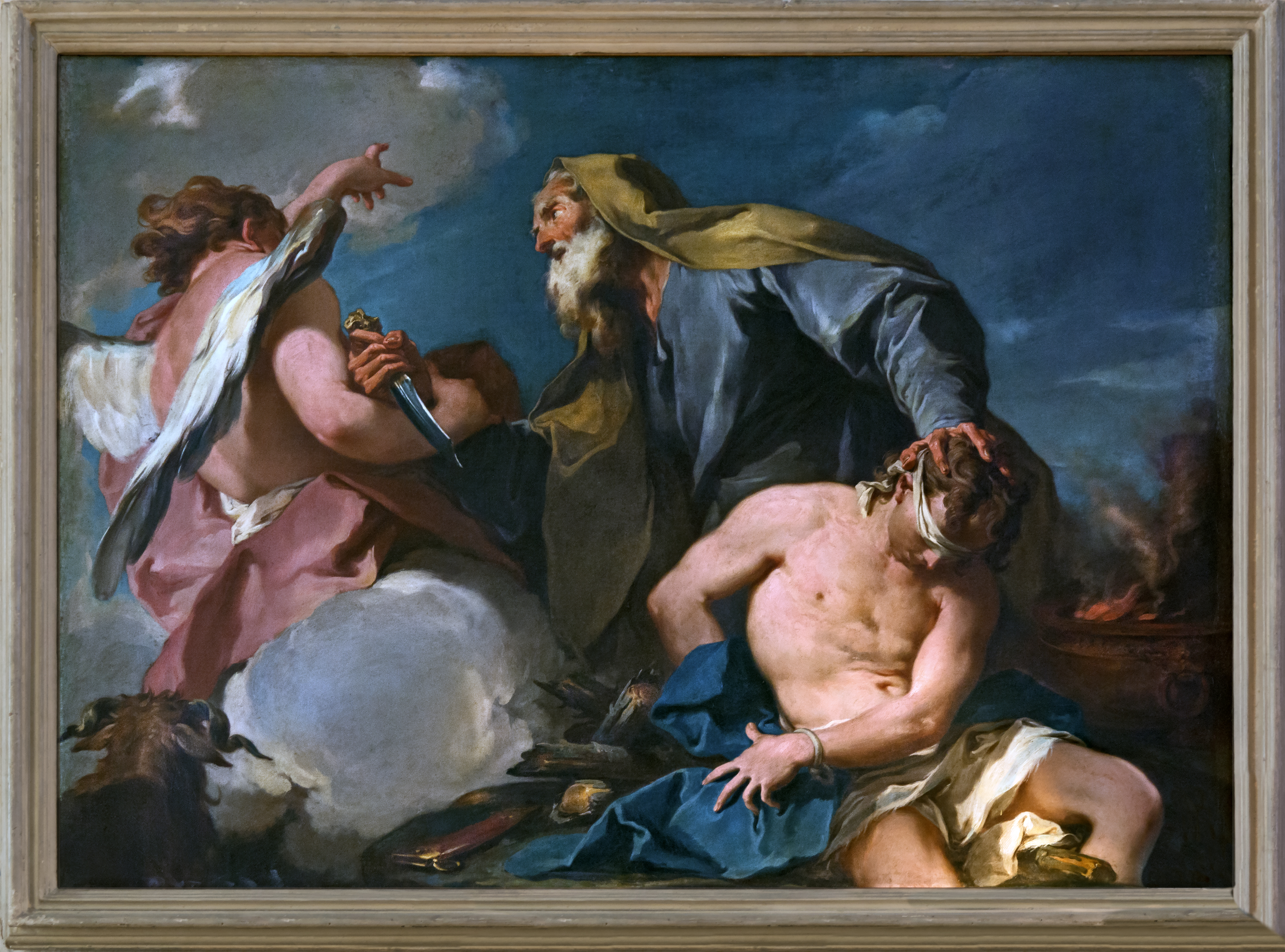

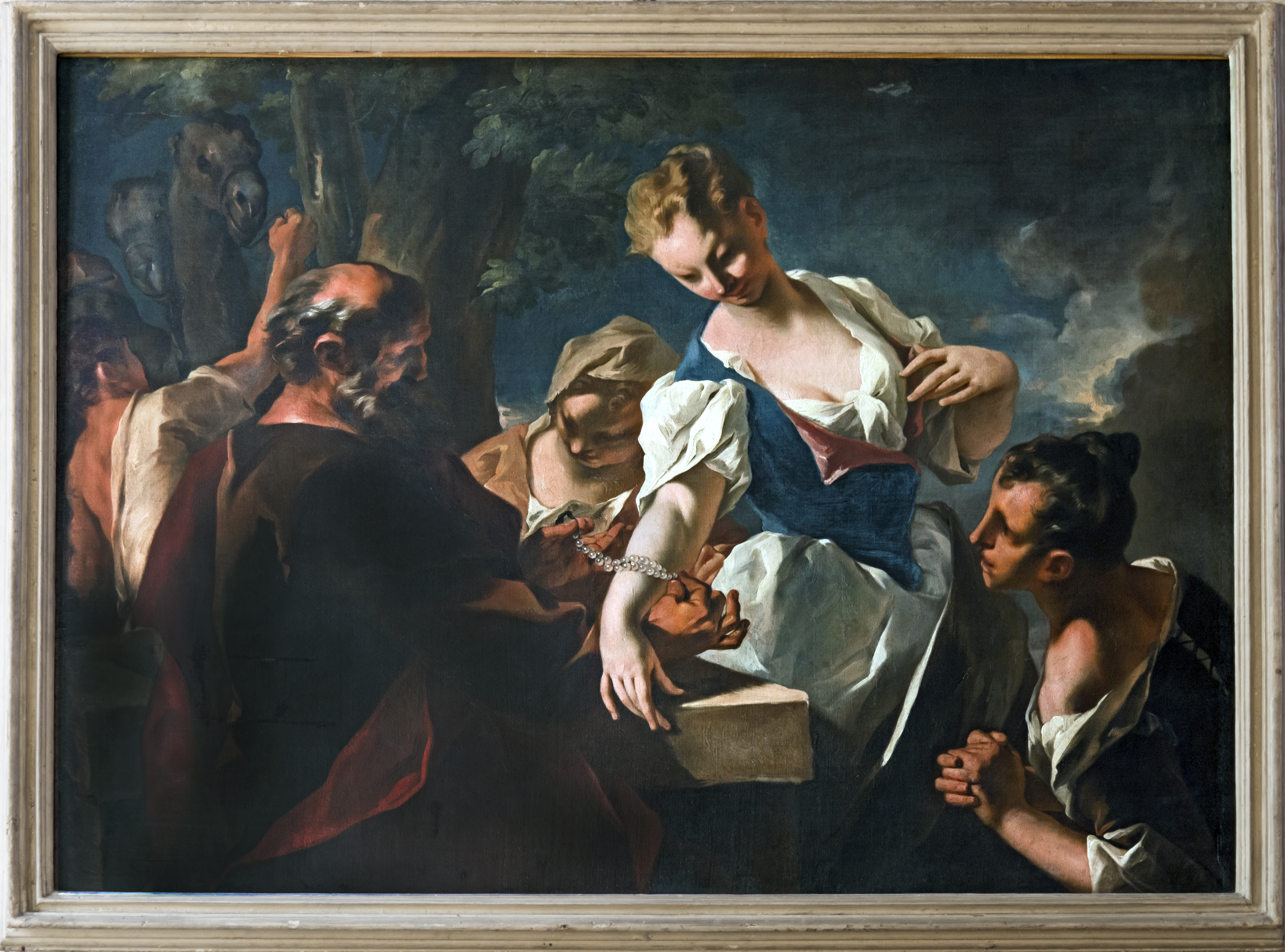

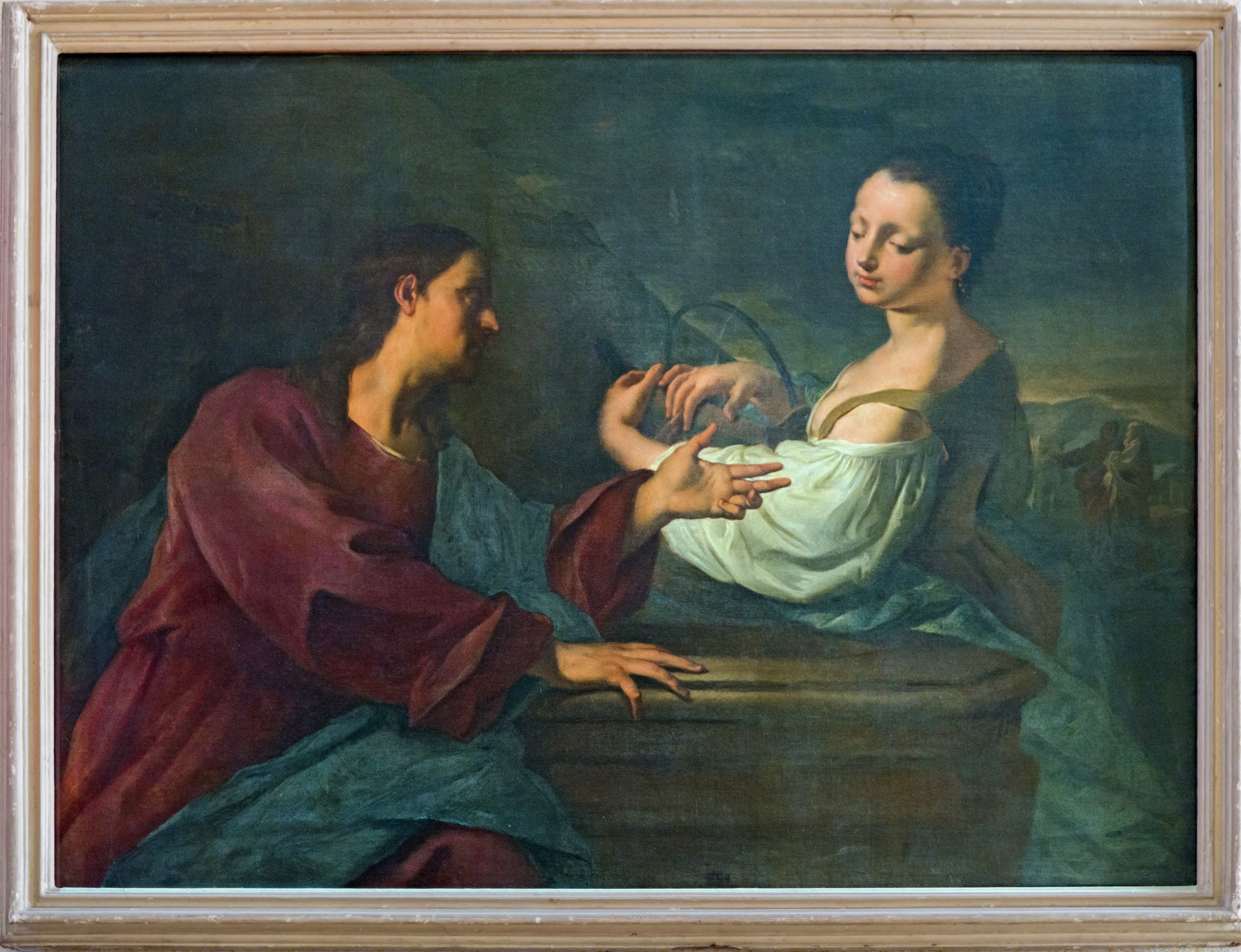

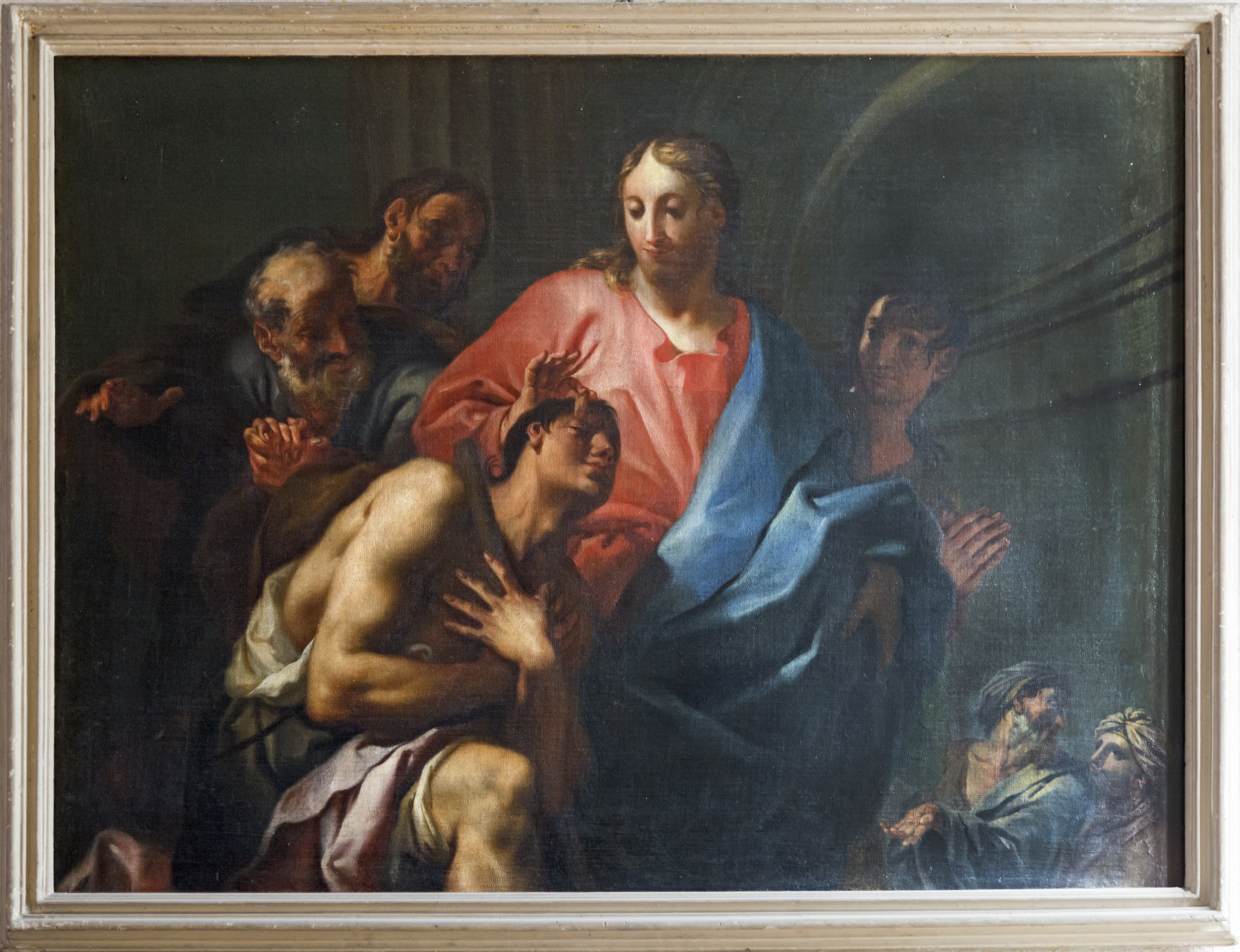

3rd Contarini dalla Porta
The chapel contains an alabaster statue of St Louis of Toulouse, and a canvas by Palma Giovane depicting the Virgin with Saints(1628). The ceiling (completed 1789) depicts the Scenes of Life and Death of St Peter of Alcantara including the Saint on the City Walls, St Theresa of Avila, St Peter, and Queen Isabel of Spain, the Death of the Saint, and Glory of the Saint, all by Francesco Fontebasso. In the walls are allegorical depictions of Faith, Hope, and Charity (right) by Jacopo Marieschi; and Religion and Meditation (left) by Francesco Maggiotto.

It houses the tomb of two doges: Alvise, doge from 1676 to 1684, and Francesco, doge from 1623 to 1624. Both busts are the work of Antonio Gai.

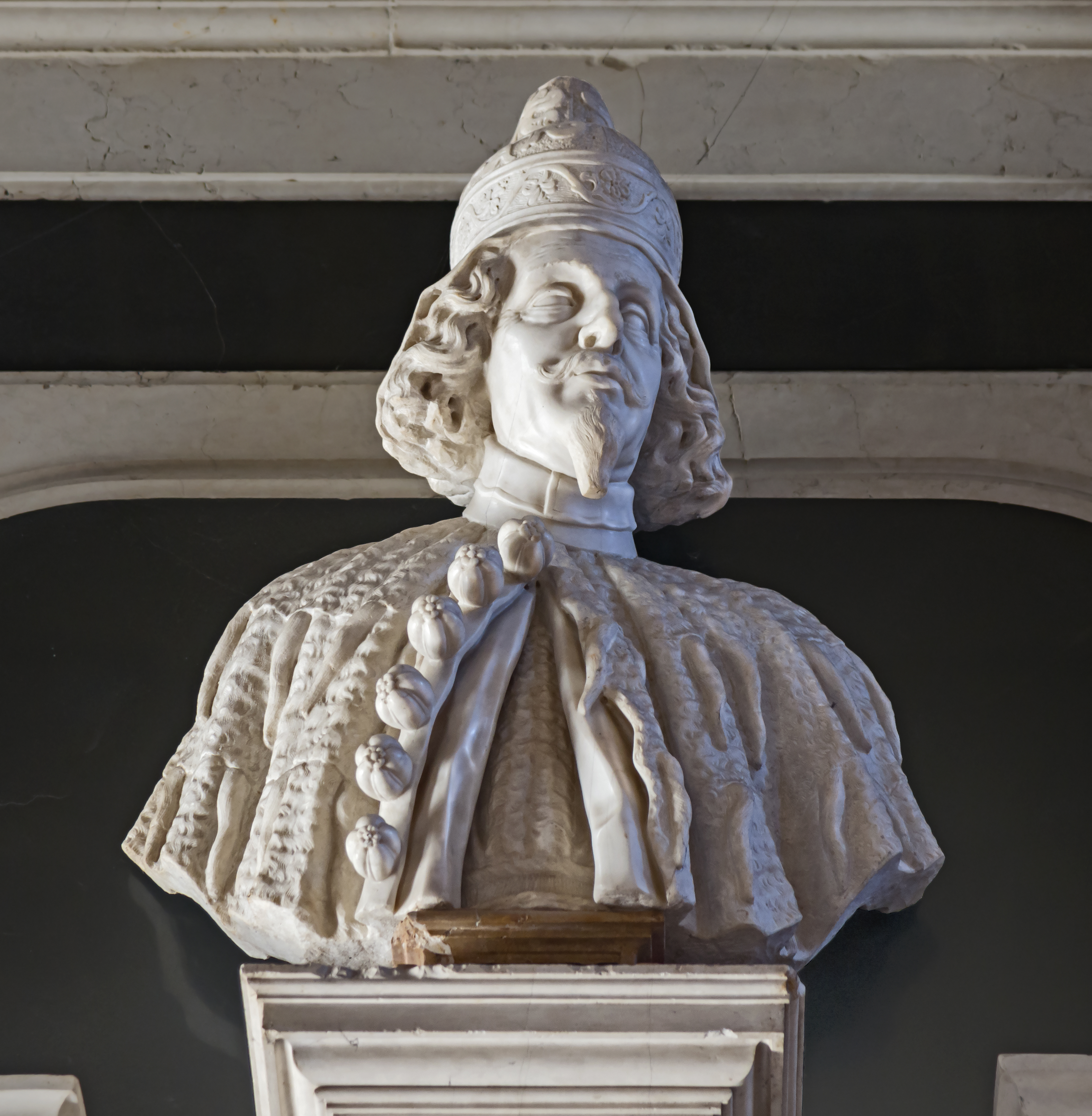
Alvise Contarini

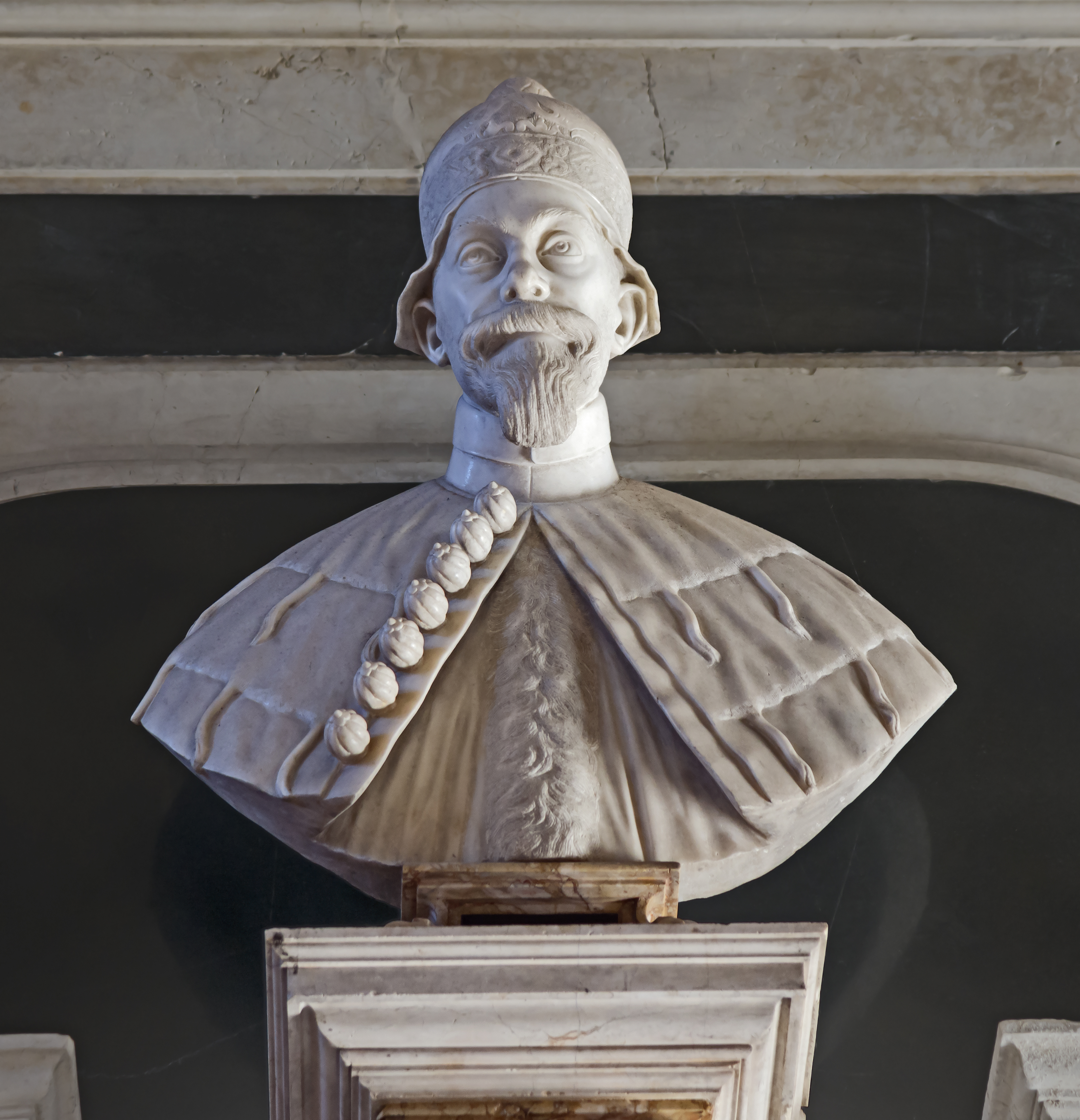
Francesco Contarini

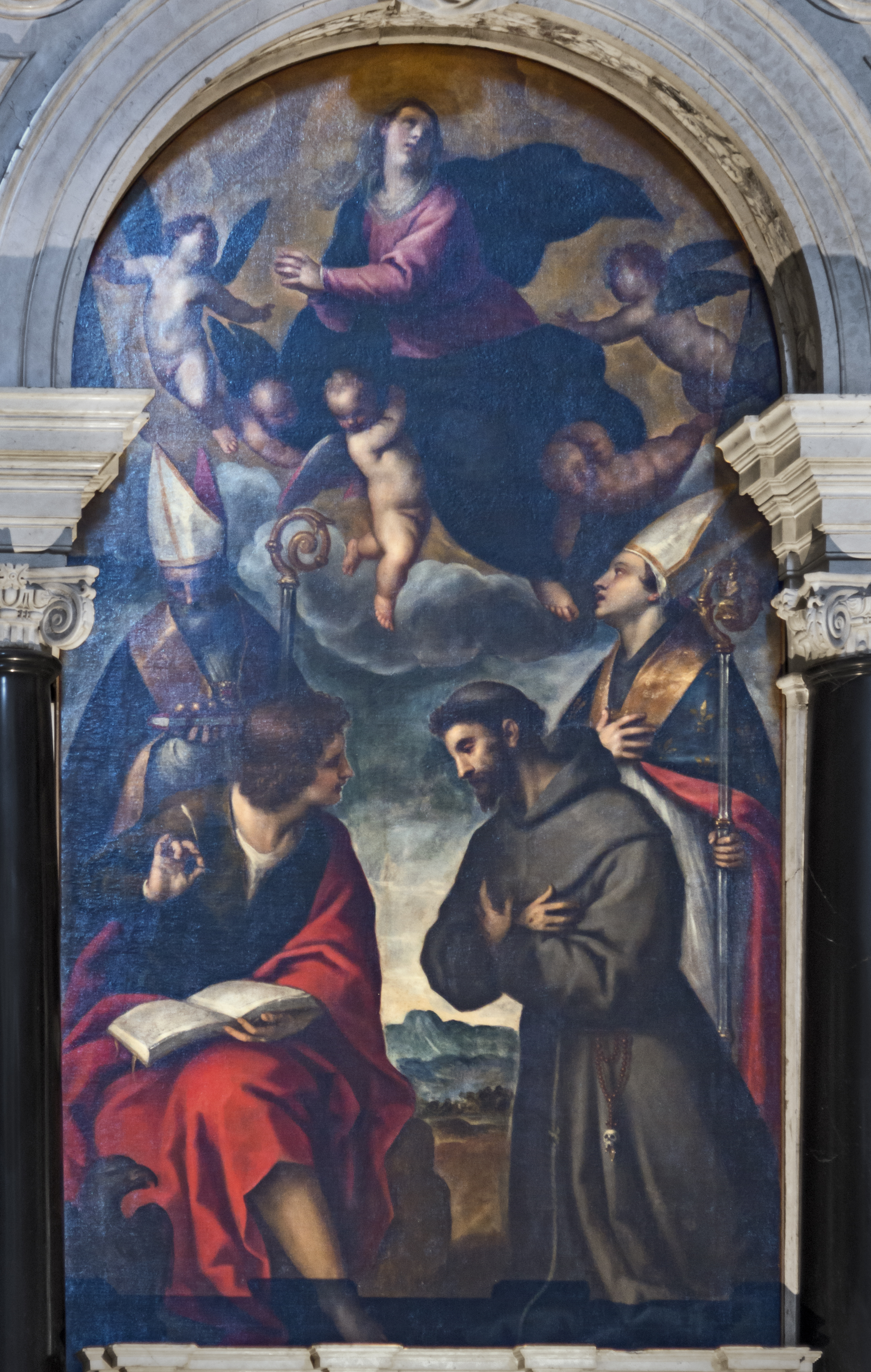
La Vergine in gloria - Palma il Giovane

4th Malipiero Badoer
The chapel contains an altarpiece depicting The Resurrection by Paolo Veronese.

5th Barbaro
The chapel has the heraldic shield of the Barbaro family, a red circle on a white background, granted to admiral Marco Barbaro after his 12th-century victory in Jaffa. The painting of the altarpiece is by Battista Franco, it is an oil on canvas representing the baptism of Christ between Saint Francis and Bernardin of Siena. These two figures, appearing well on either side of the central group, are masked by the two columns.

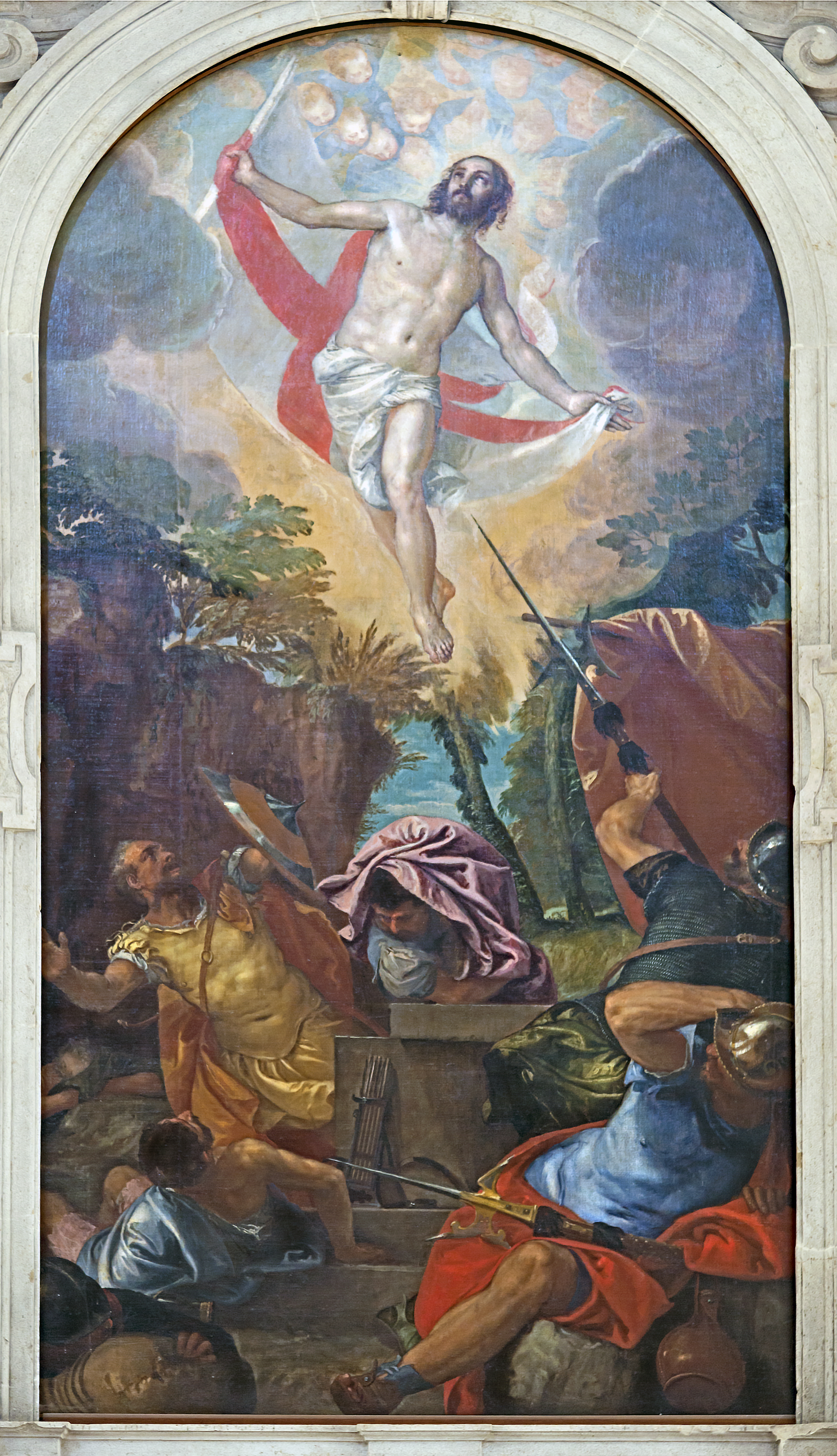
The Resurrection by Paolo Veronese

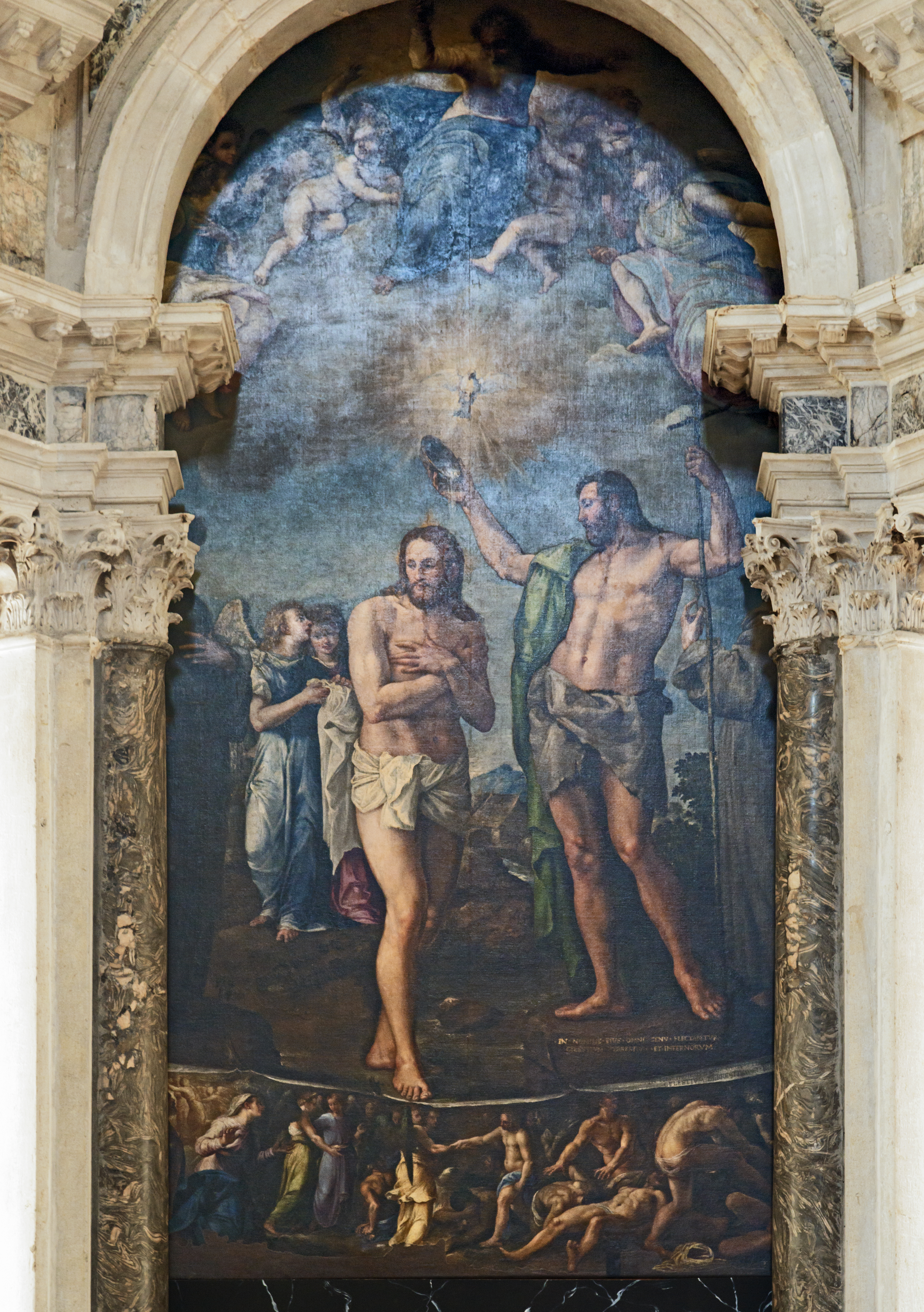
The baptism of Christ, Battista Franco

=== The right pulpit ===
It was erected at the expense of Matteo Goretto with an underlying altar dedicated to St. Matthew with a painting depicting the apostle of Francesco Montemezzano. Above the pulpit is another painting by the same author "La Vergine Assunta" (late sixteenth century).

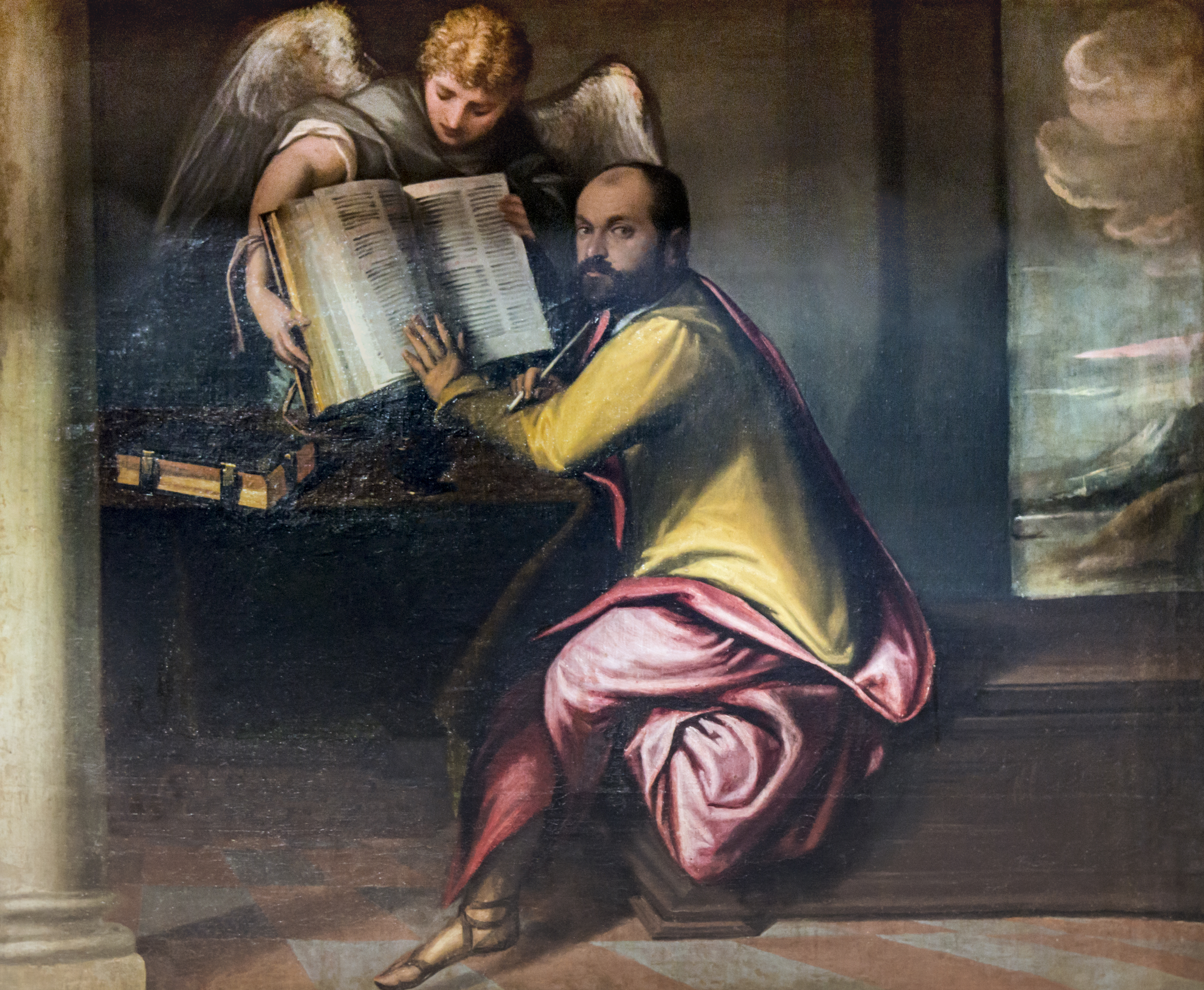
Matthew the Apostle by Francesco Montemezzano

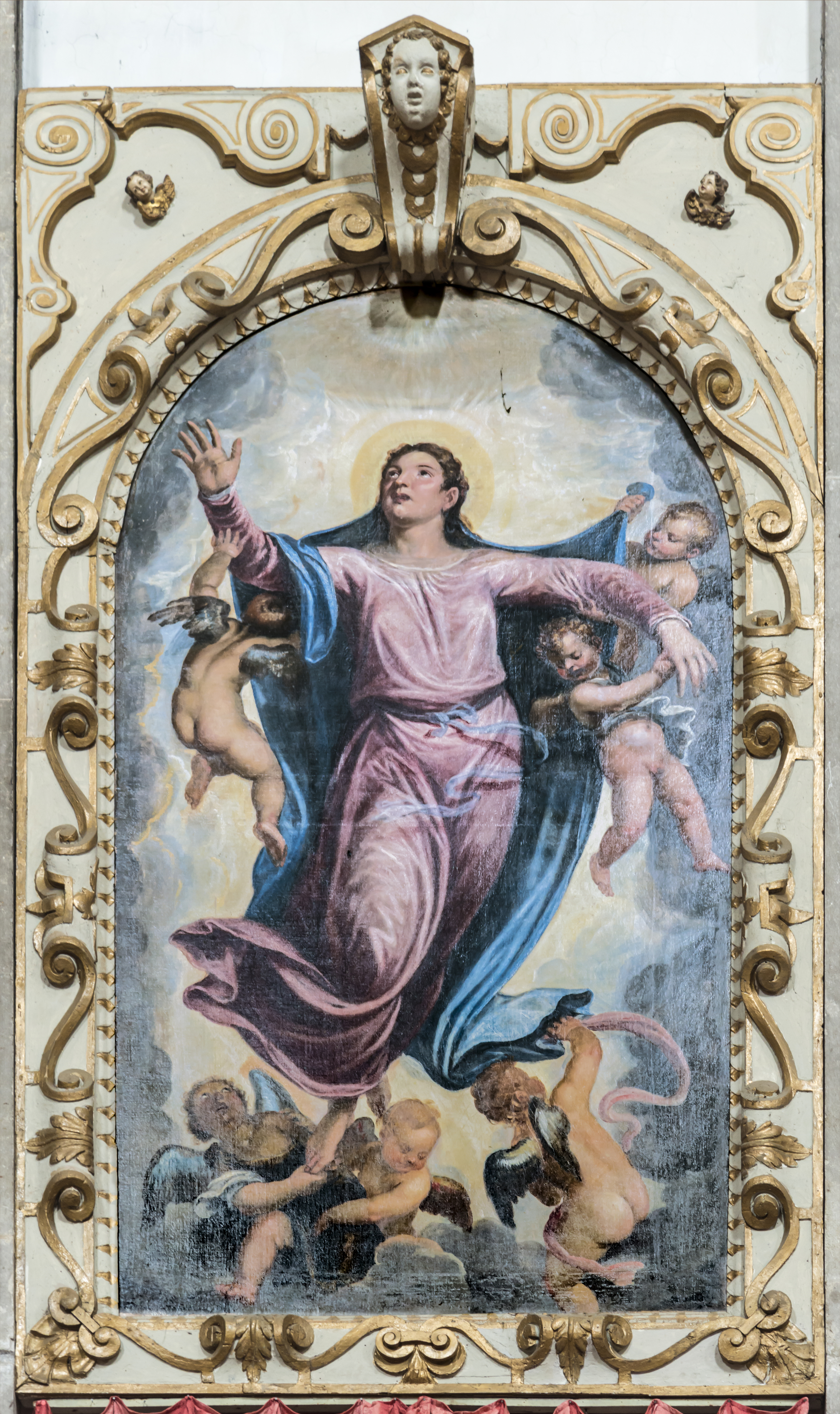
The assumption of the Virgin by Francesco Montezzano

=== Left ===
1st left, The Grimani chapel is dedicated to the Grimani family under the patronage of the Magi. It was purchased in 1537 by Vettor Grimani procurator of San Marco.

The vault is richly decorated by fifteen medallions known as "Roman" (circular boxes alternated with square boxes). The seven angelic virtues are found in the squares and in the eight circles the human virtues by Battista Franco called Semolei (1561). The altar whose altarpiece shows the "Adoration of the Magi" in 1564 by Federico Zuccari, was painted in oil directly on the marble. This choice explains the state of the work. On both sides in niches of the allegory of the Peace in bronze by Tiziano Aspetti who is the author of the statues of the Palladian facade of the church. Above the altar are three frescoes with the center: "The resurrection of Christ", right: "Elijah cured the son of the widow" and left: "Elijah and the chariot of fire", by Battista Franco. On the right side a fresco framed with gypsy "Resurrected Lazarus" (Resurrezione di Lazzaro) (1561) Federico Zuccari.

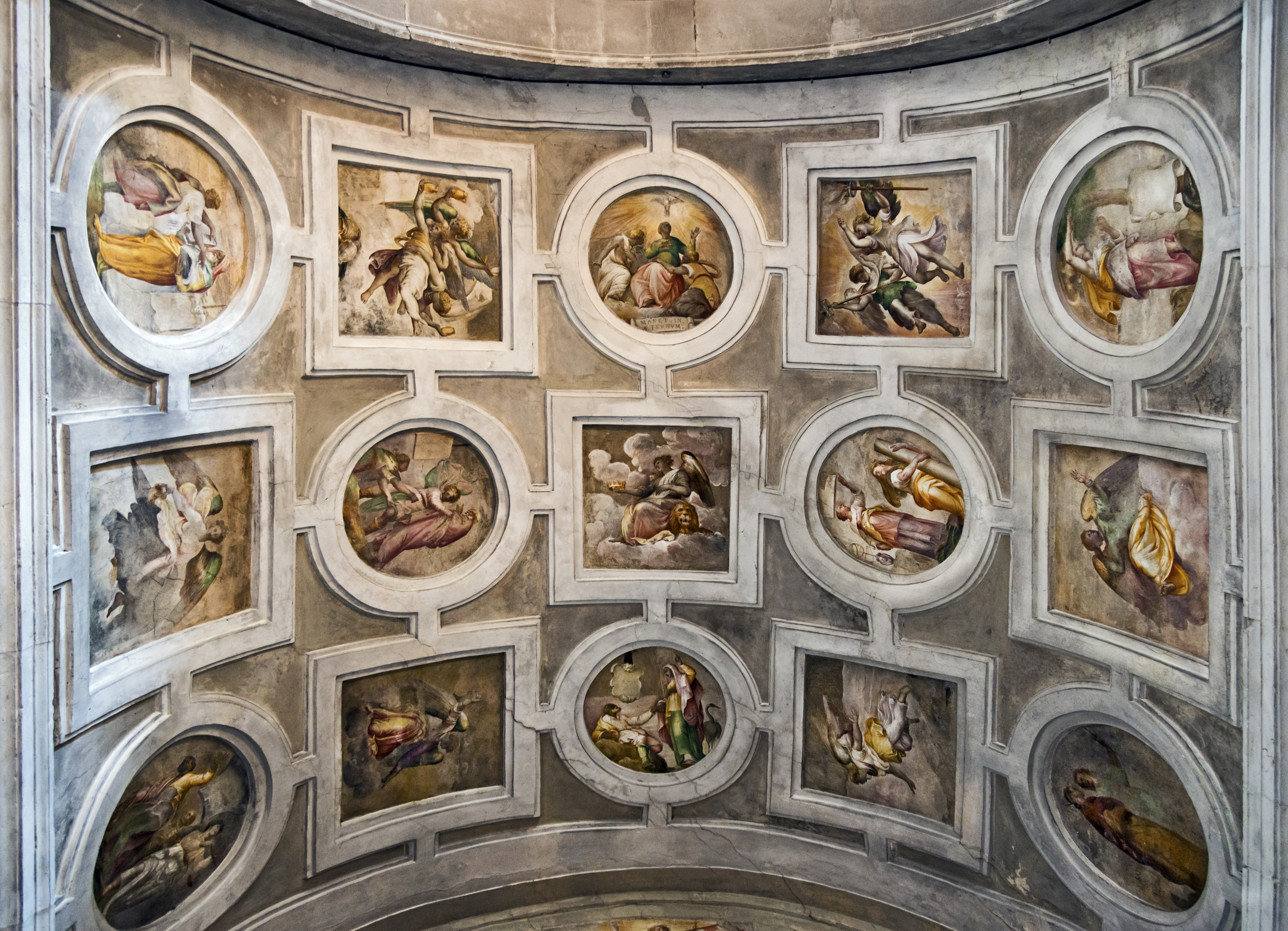
"The Angelic Virtues, and the Human Virtues" by Battista Franco

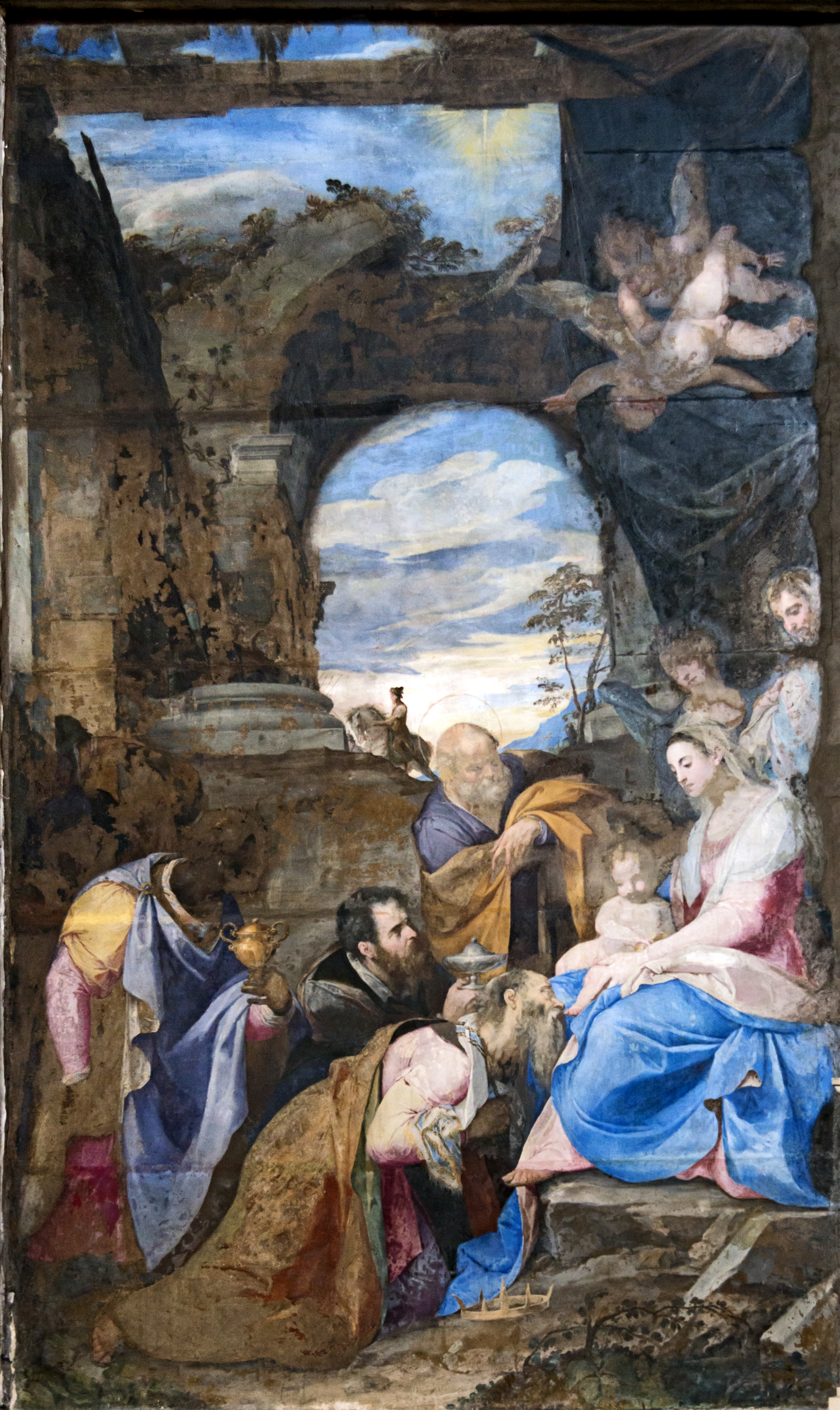
"Adoration of the Magi" by Federico Zuccari

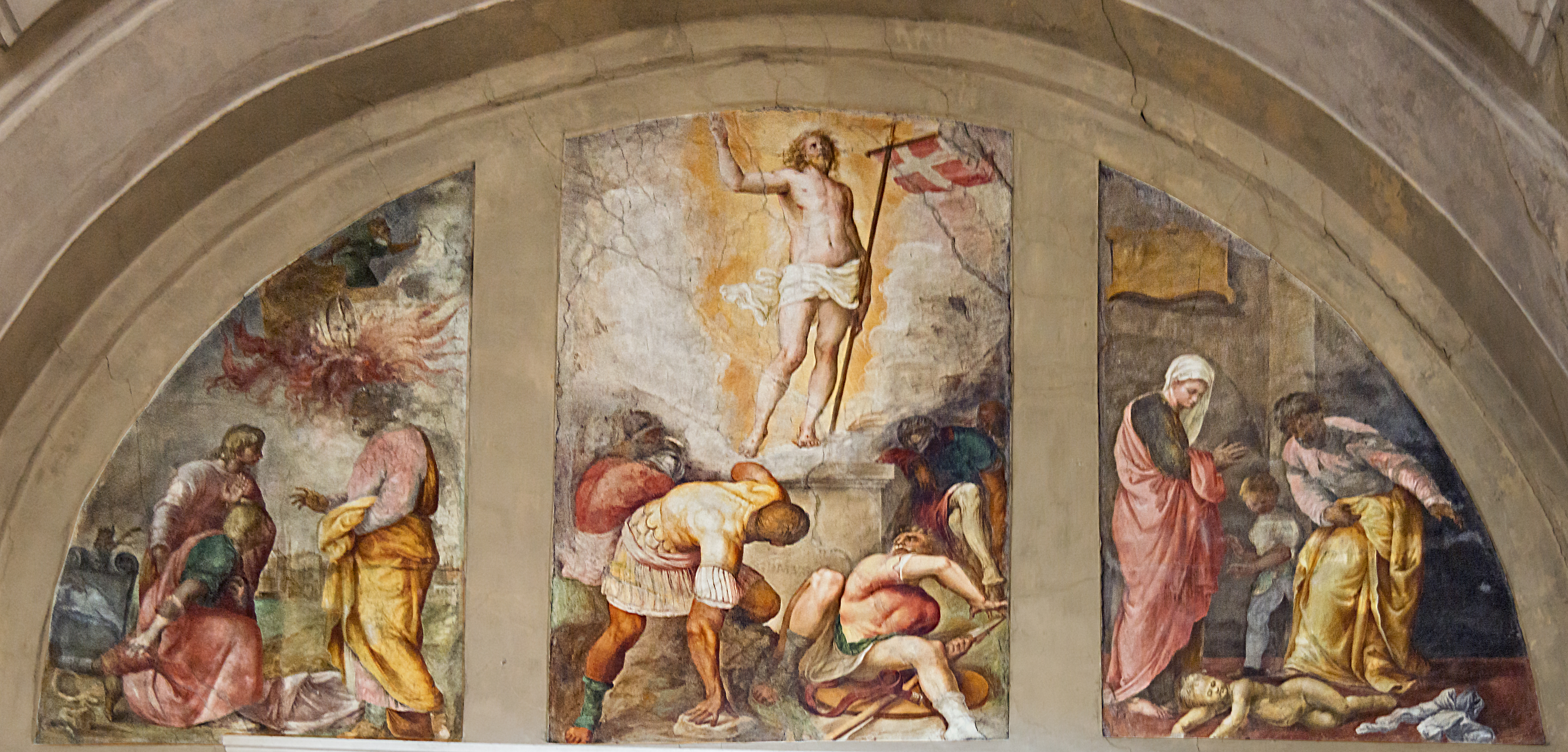
Above the altar three paintings by Battista Franco

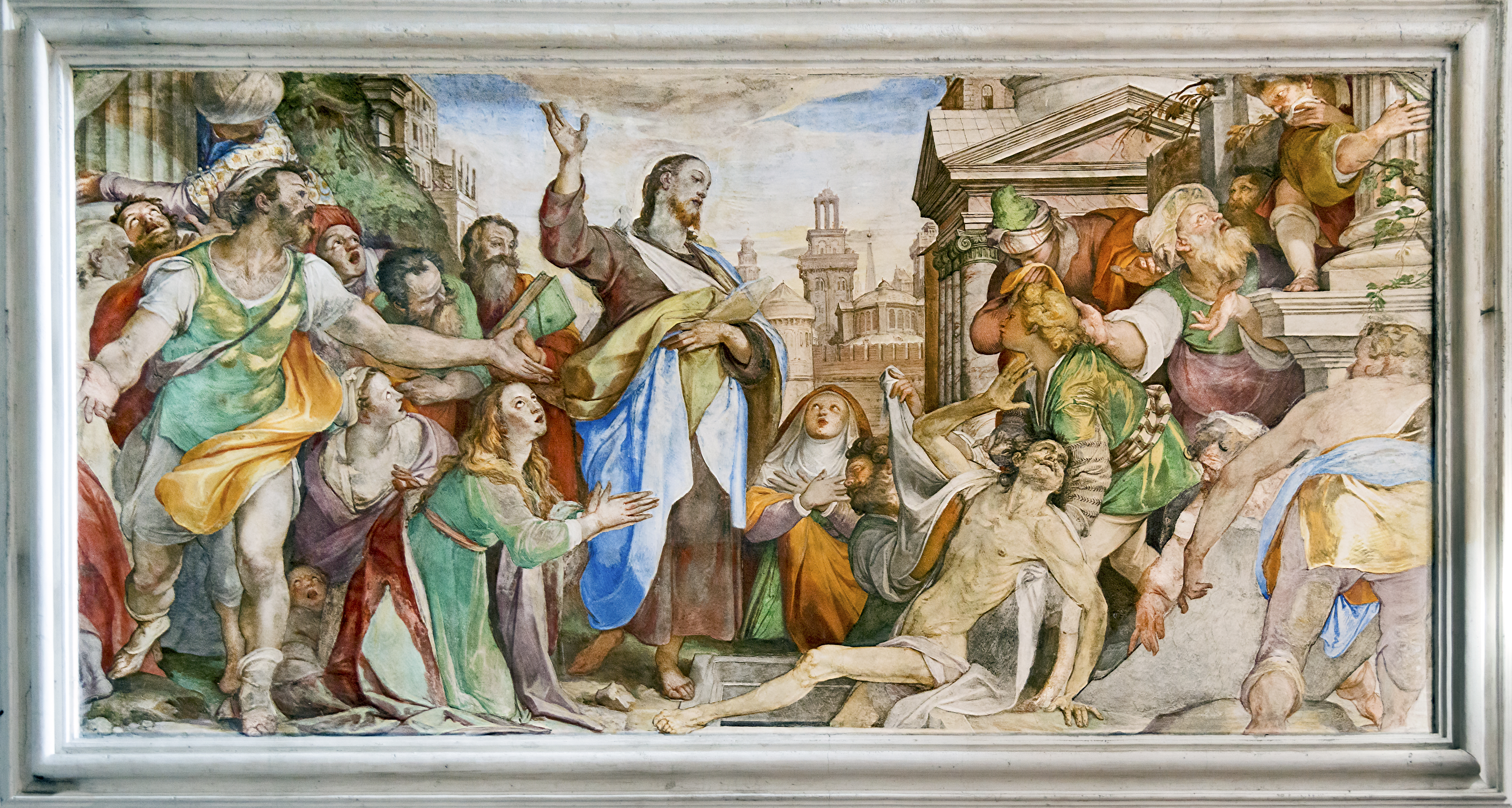
Lazarus risen" by Federico Zuccari

2nd left, Montefeltro or of St Anthony Abbot

Second chapel on the left. Nicola da Urbino, Count of Montefeltro, in 1397 draws up a will by which he gives the Procurator of San Marco 2000 gold coins. He asks that a third of this sum be allocated to the constitution of a chapel in the church of San Marco. The vow will not be respected and it is only 150 years later that the chapel is erected on the occasion of the reconstruction of San Francesco della Vigna. It is under the patronage of Anthony the Great (Sant'Antonio abate).

The altar and the marble altarpiece date from 1561, they are due to Francesco Smeraldi. The three statues are of Alessandro Vittoria (1563): in the center of San Antonio Abatea, right St. Sebastian, on the left St. Roch. On the left side of the chapel is a work by Parrasio Micheli "The Fall of the Manna" (Caduta della Manna), on the right side a painting attributed to Parrasio Micheli representing the sacrifice of Melchizedek (Sacrificio di Melchisedech).

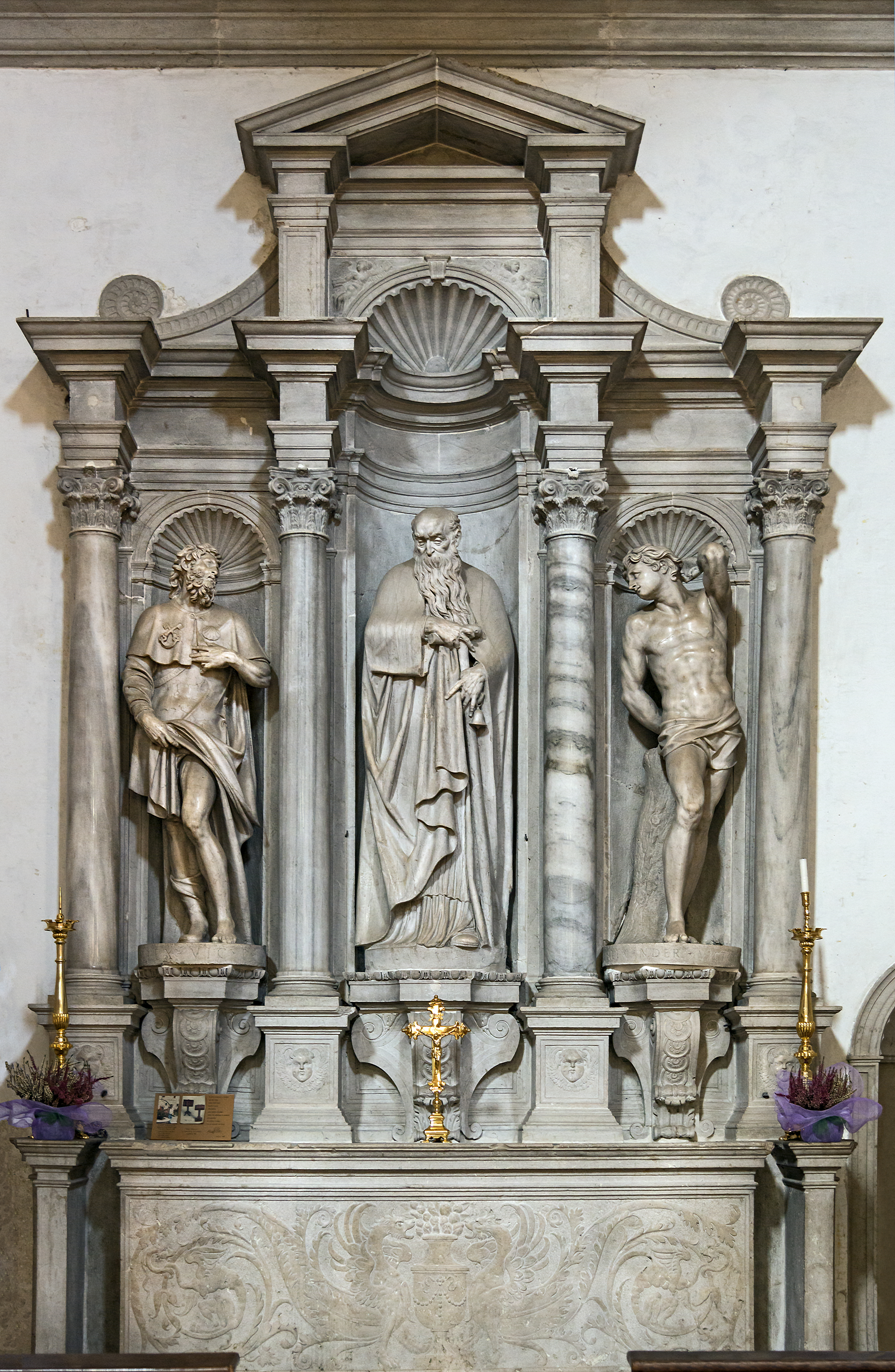
Altar by Francesco Smeraldi

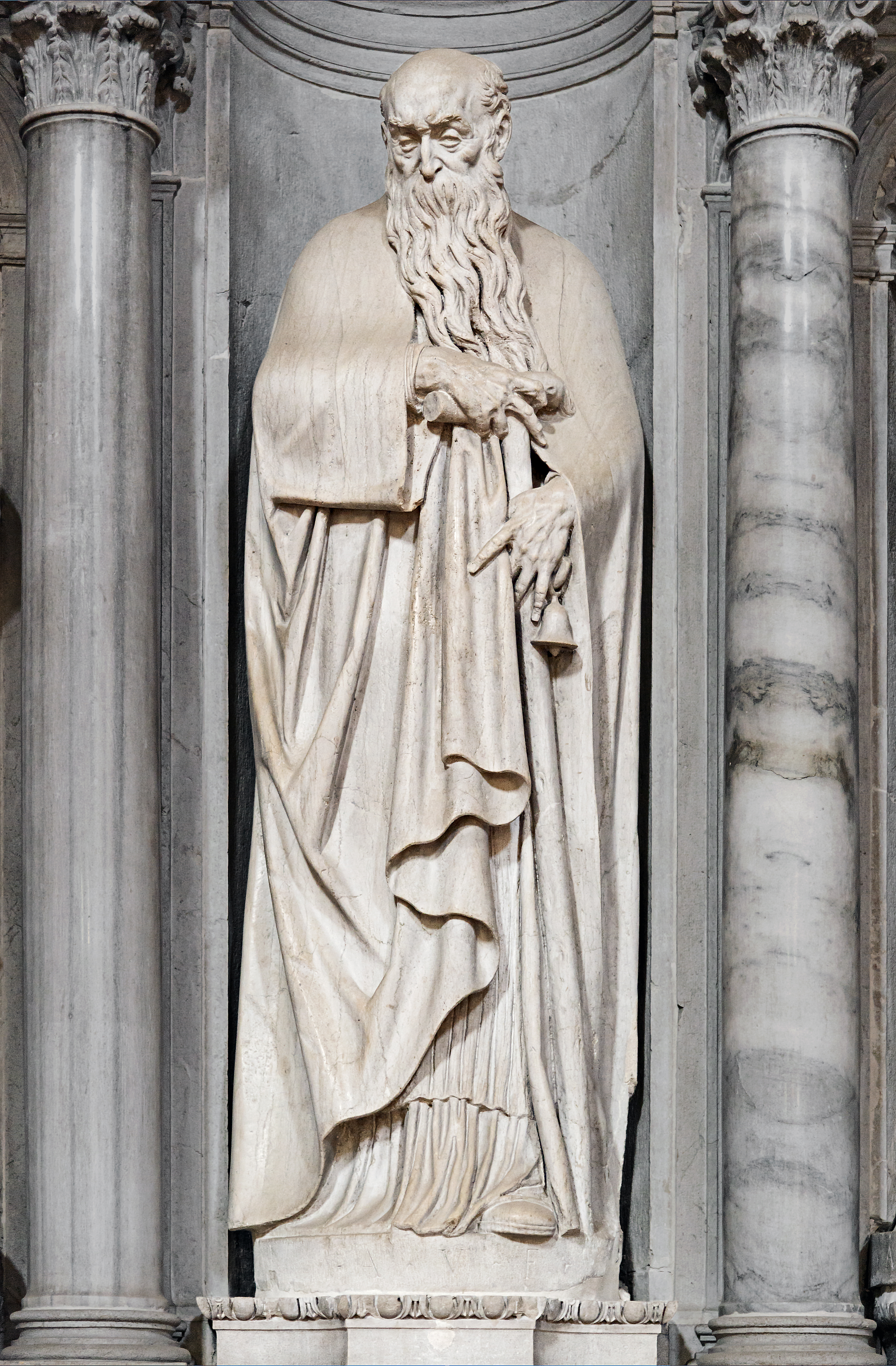
St. Anthony the Great by Alessandro Vittoria

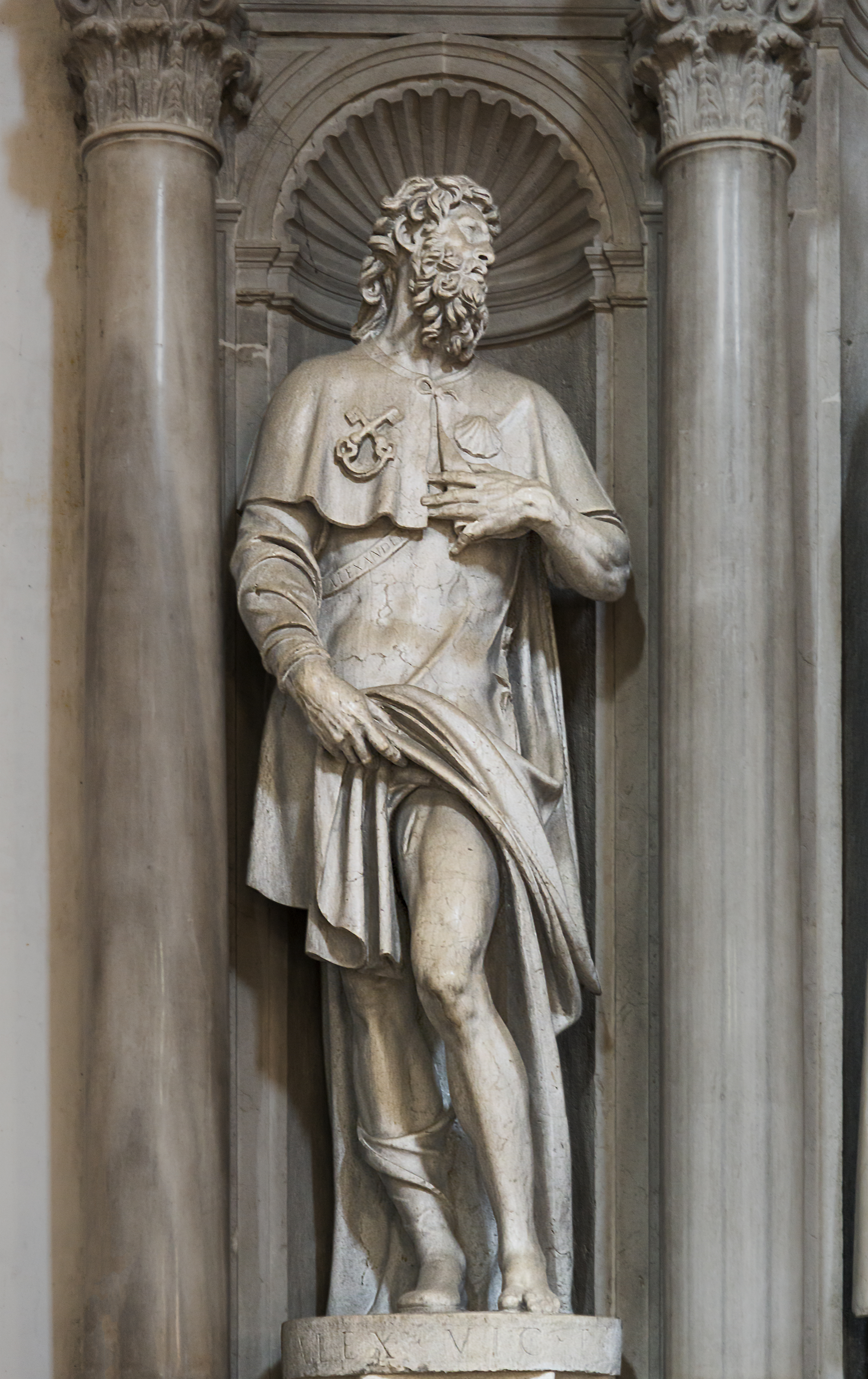
St. Roch by Alessandro Vittoria

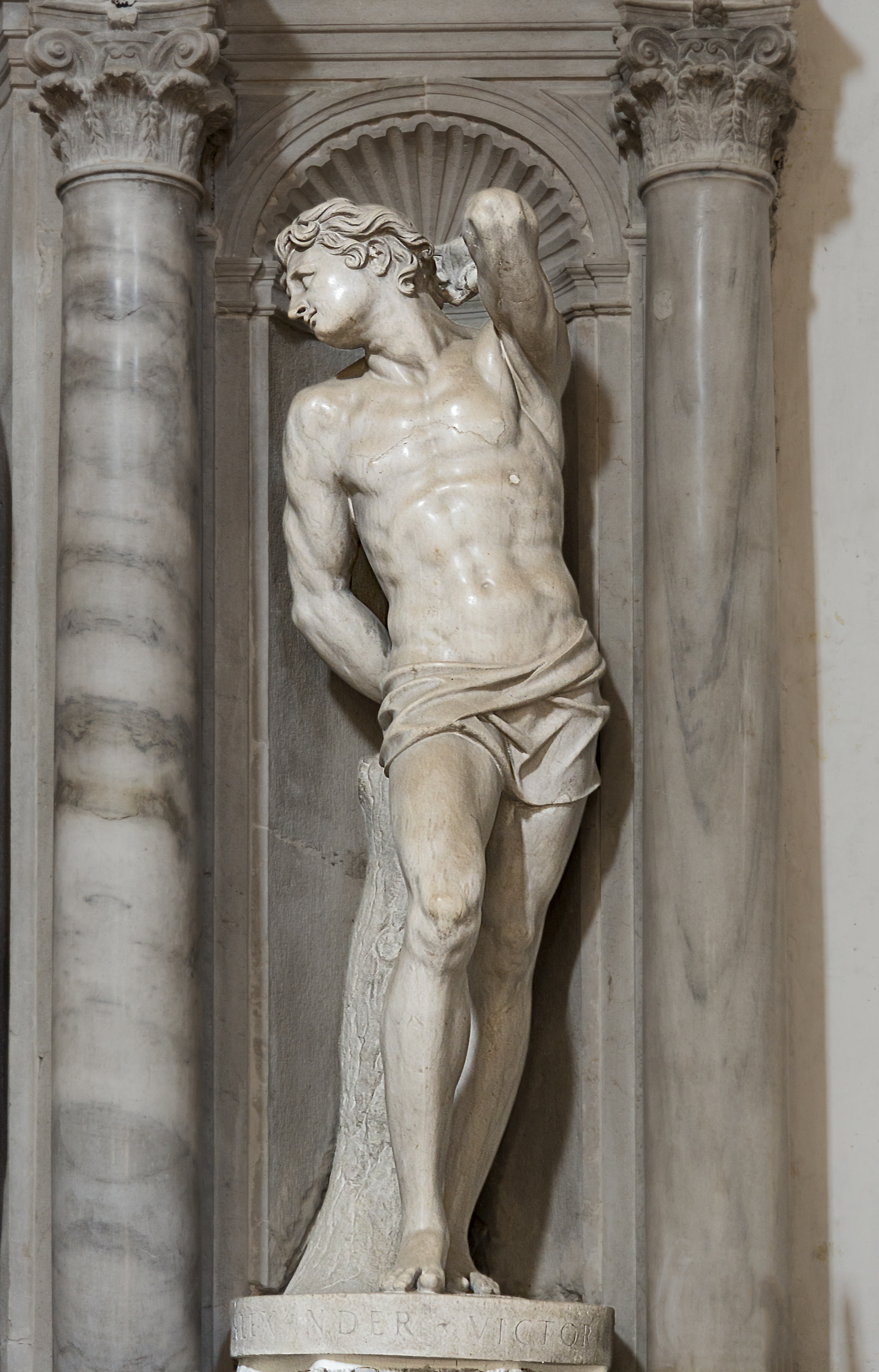
St. Sebastian by Alessandro Vittoria

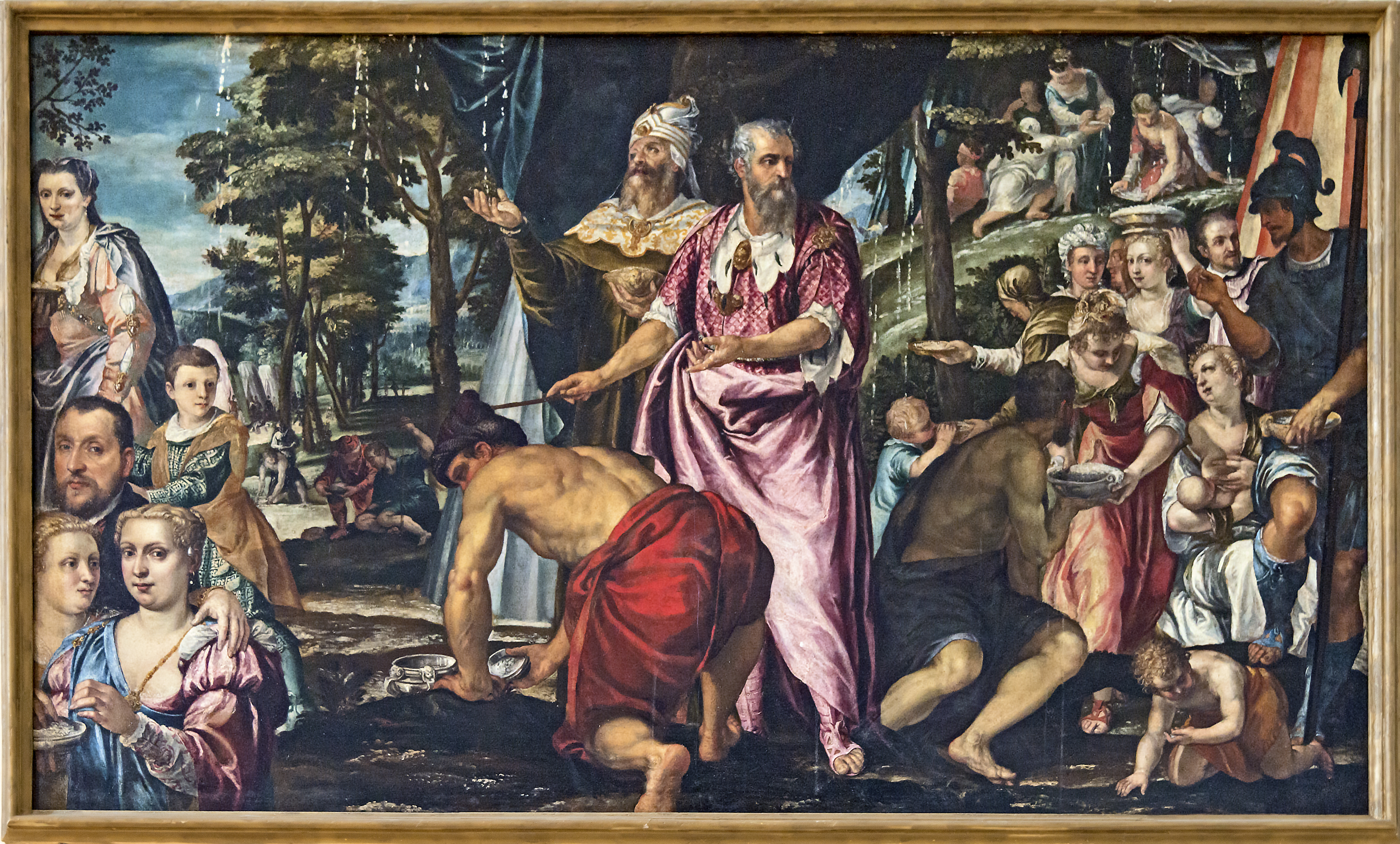
"The fall of the manna" by Parrasio Micheli

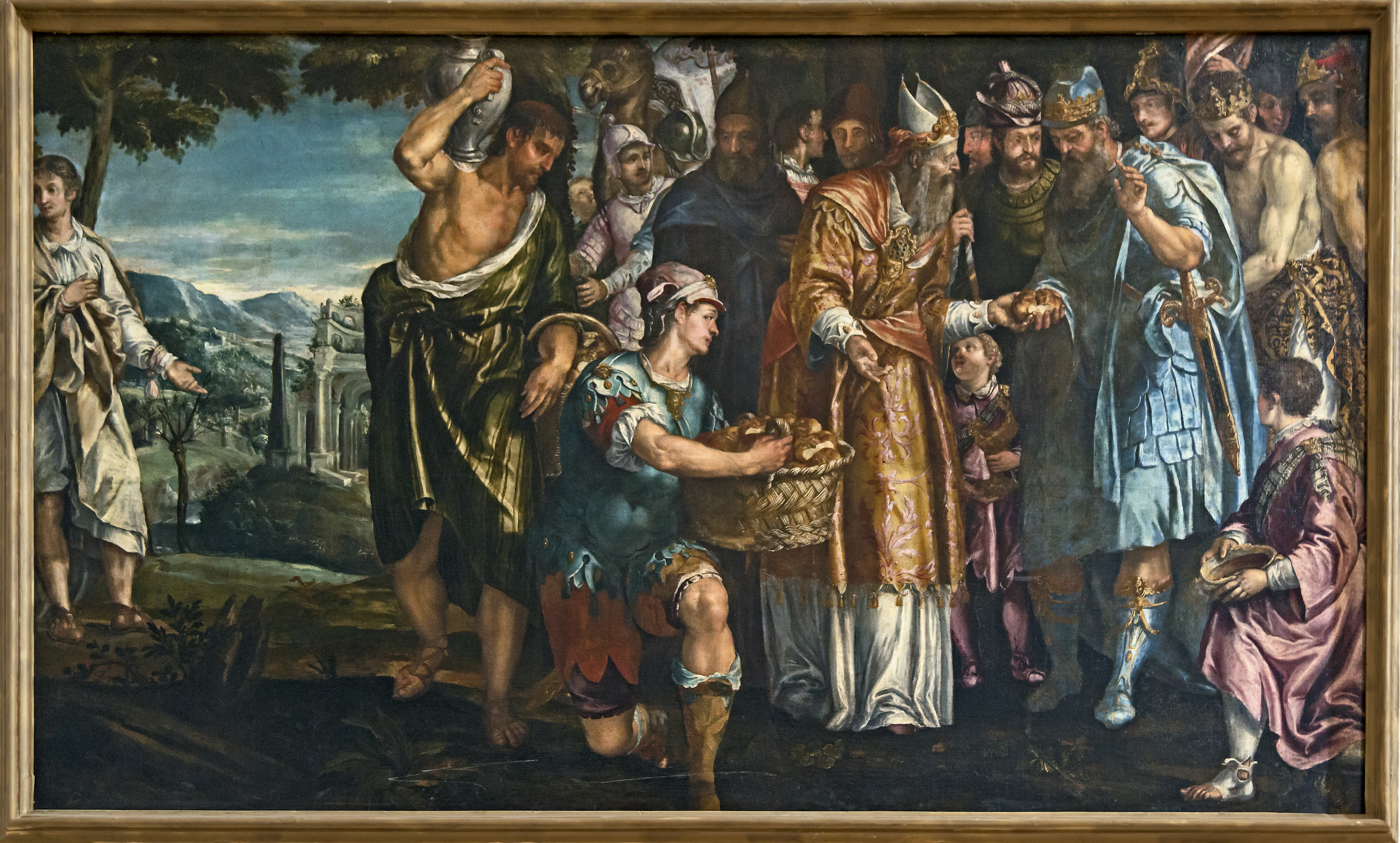
"Sacrifice of Melchizedek" by Parrasio Micheli

3rd left, Sagredo
The chapel was designed by Tommaso Temanza. It is dedicated to Saint Gherardo Sagredo, an ancestor who died in 1046, and was declared blessed in 1076. The pendedentives depict the four evangelists and four virtues by Tiepolo. The cupola has a fresco painted sotto in su by Pellegrini. The chapel has statue of the Blessed Gherardo by Andrea Cominelli, and other sculptures by Justus Le Court and Enrico Merengo. On the walls are two funeral monuments with busts to the Doges Nicolò Sagredo (ruled 1675-76) and Giovanni Sagredo (ruled 1676-91), with busts by Giovanni Gai. The chapel underscores the complex machinations in an oligarchic and aristocratic Venice to uphold the family name.

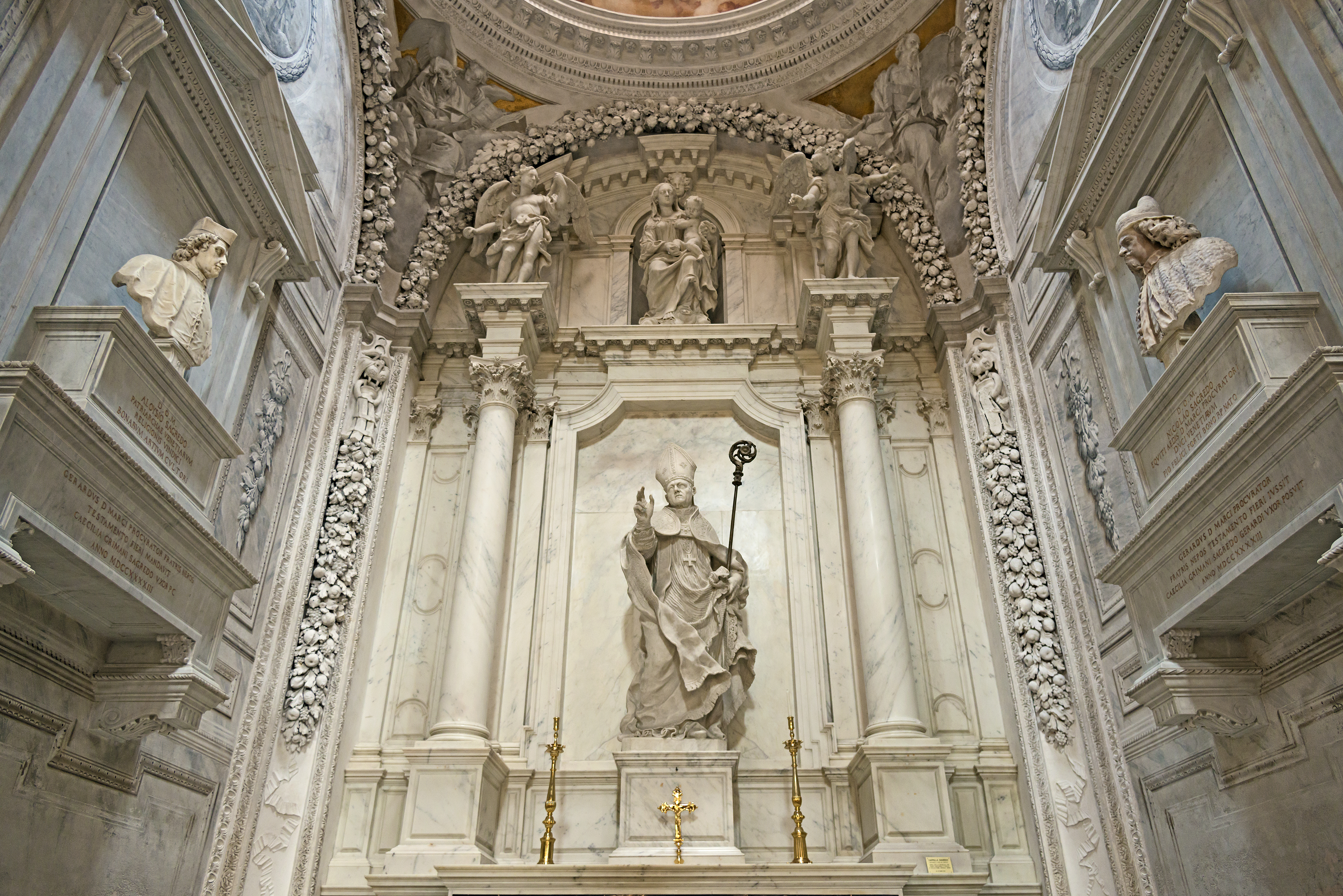
The Chapel (with a statue of Gerardo Sagredo by Josse de Corte)

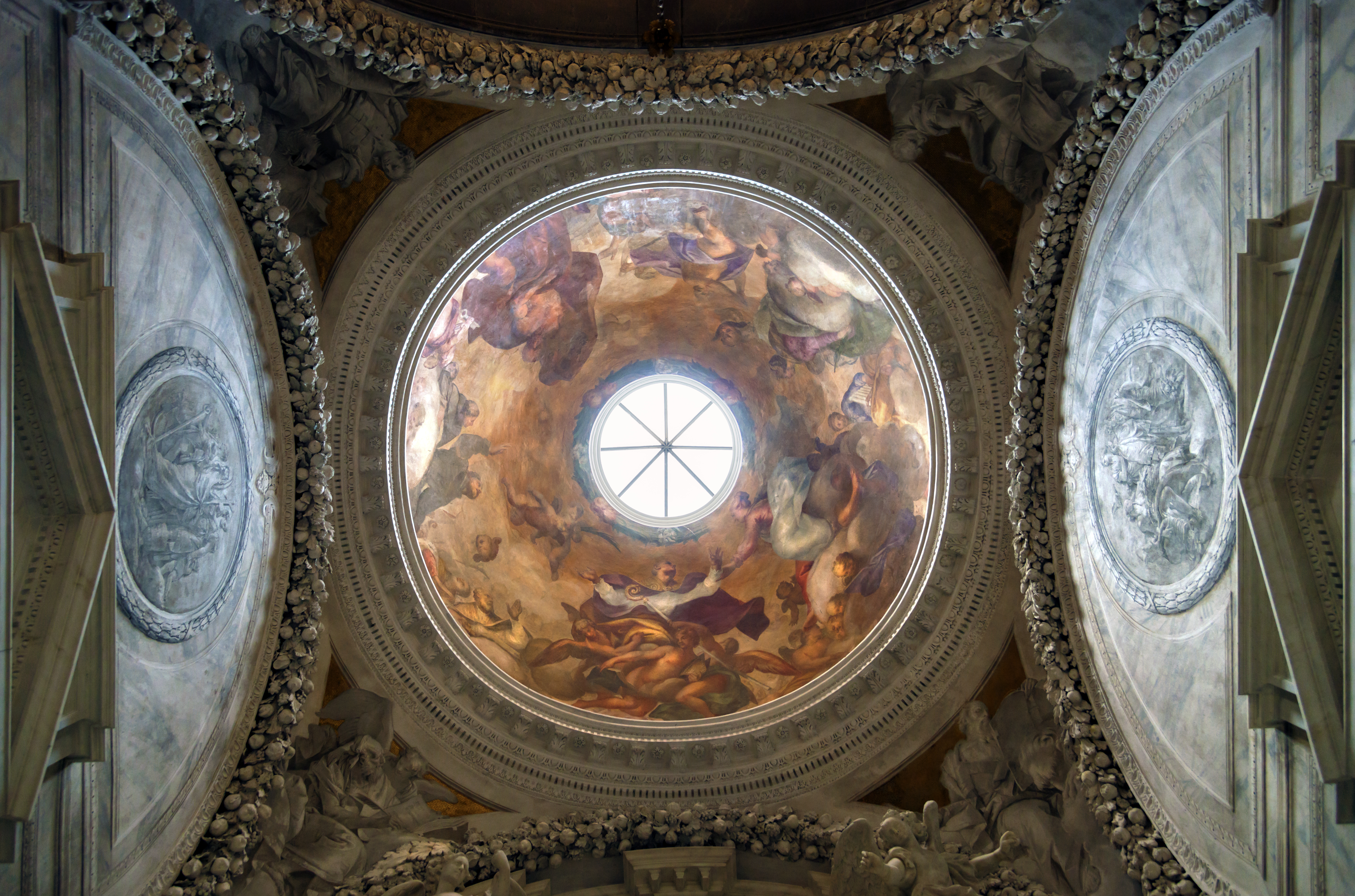
Cupola frescoes by Girolamo Pellegrini

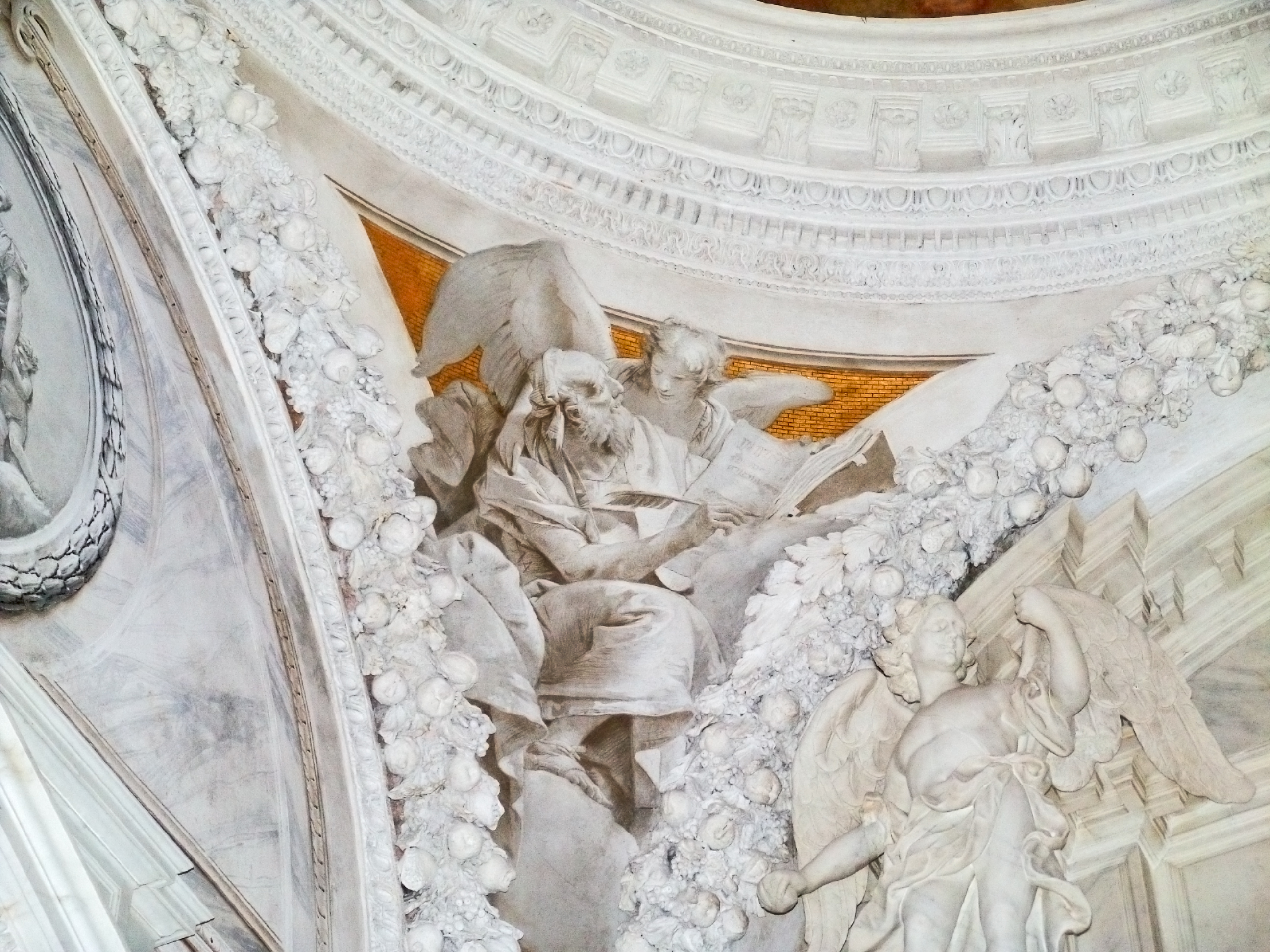
Pendentive by Tiepolo

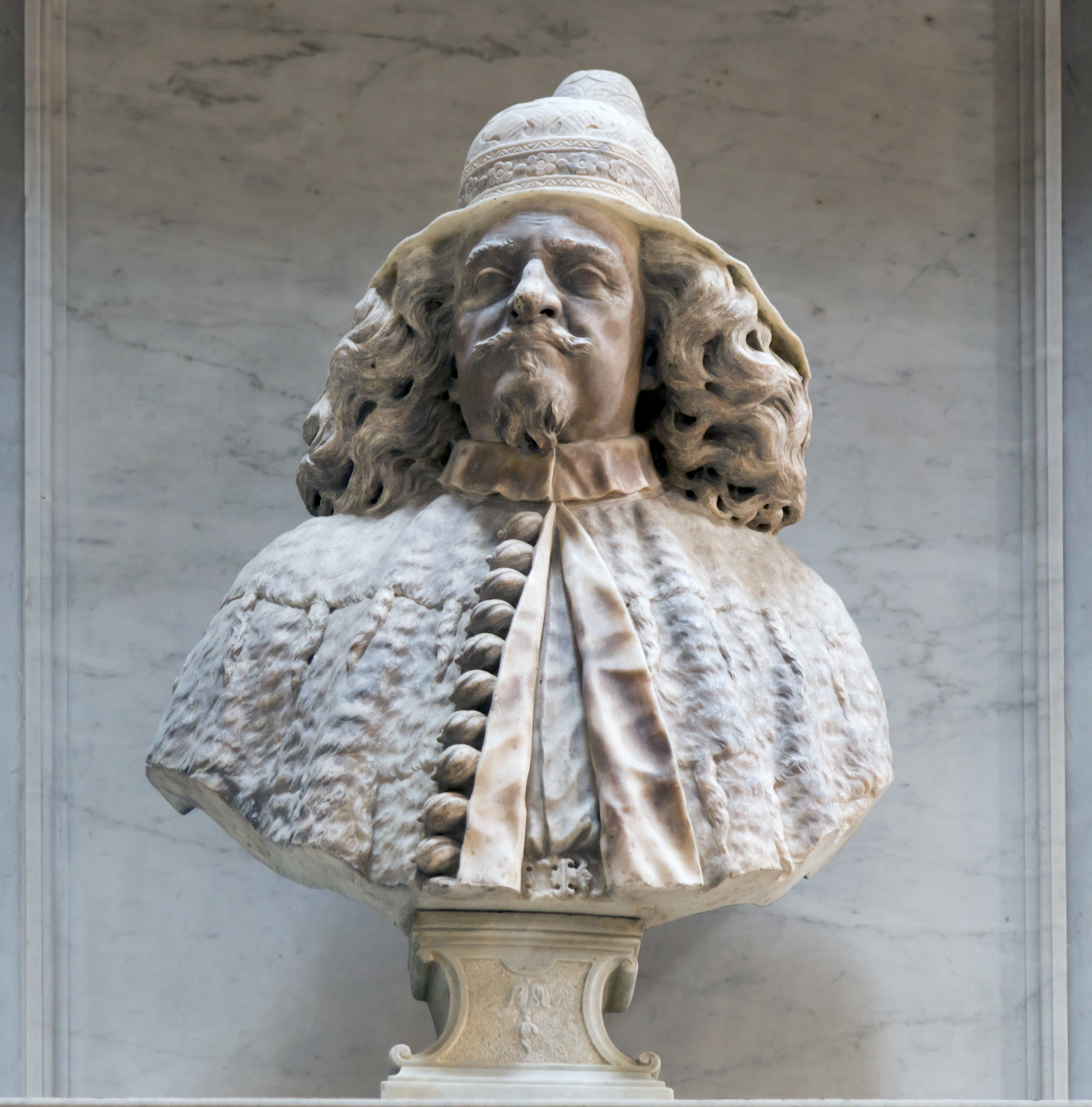
Nicolò Sagredo

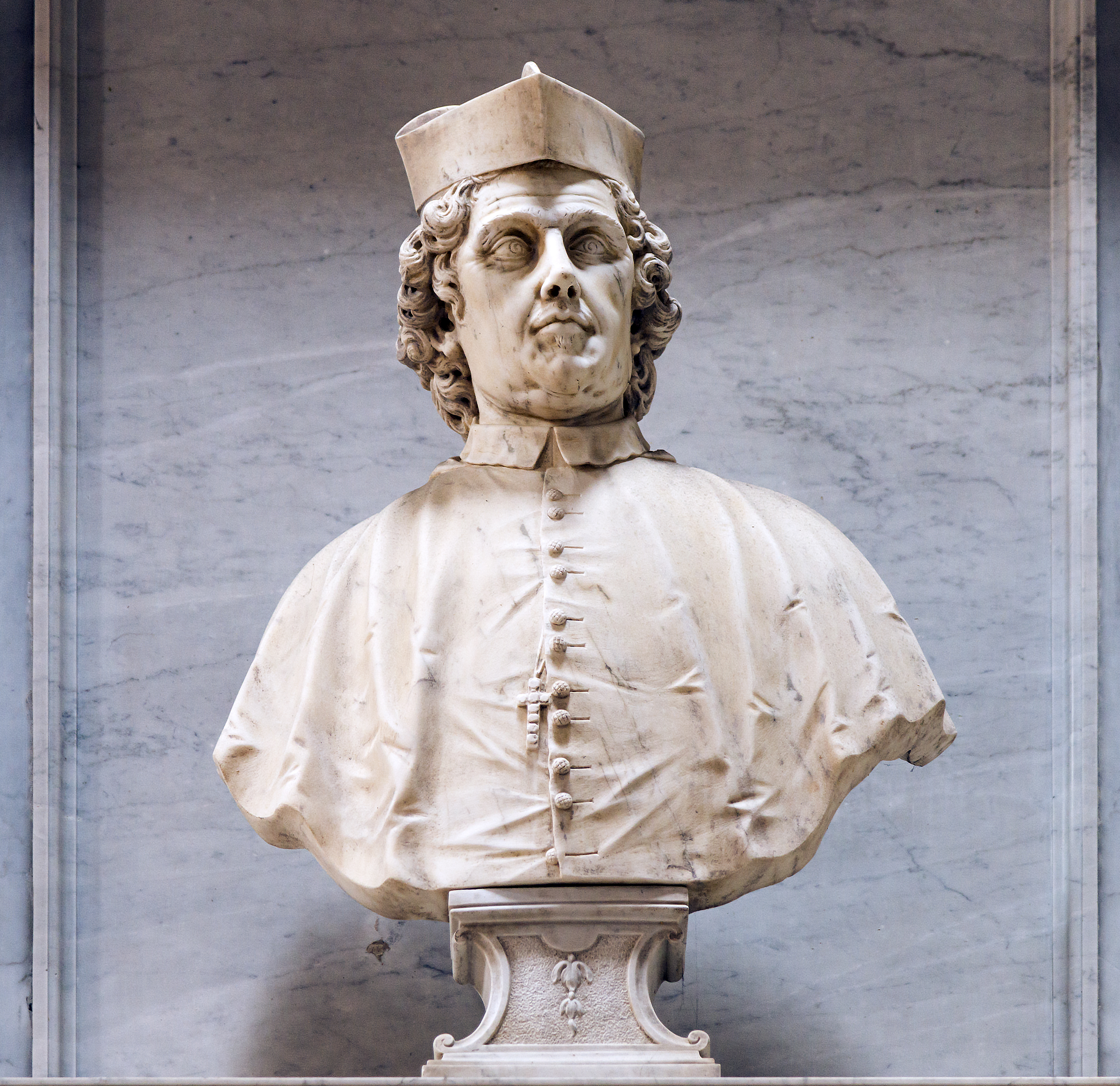
Alvise Sagredo

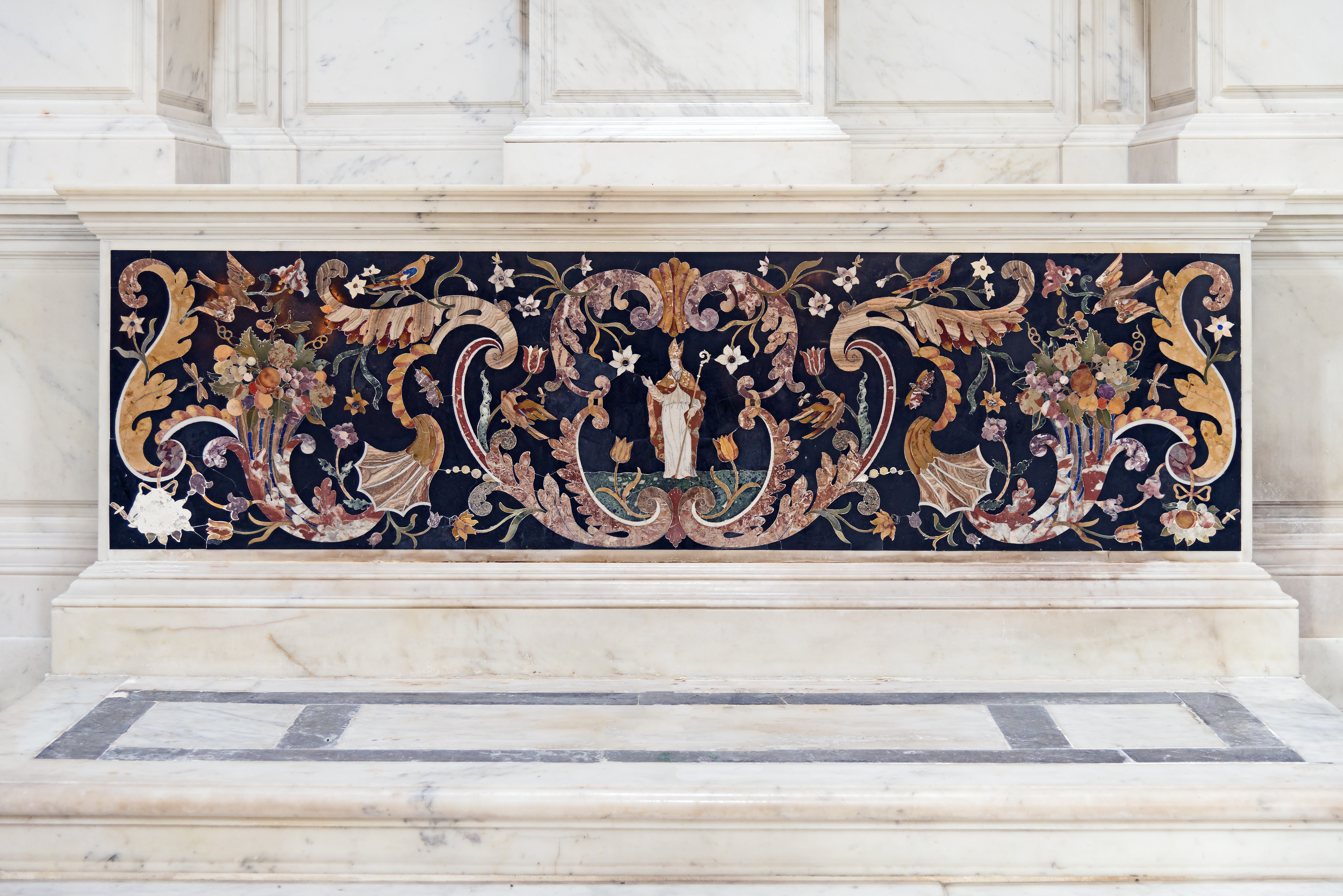
Polychrome stone altar

4th left Dandolo
The chapel has a painting of San Bernardo da Siena and works by Giuseppe Porta.

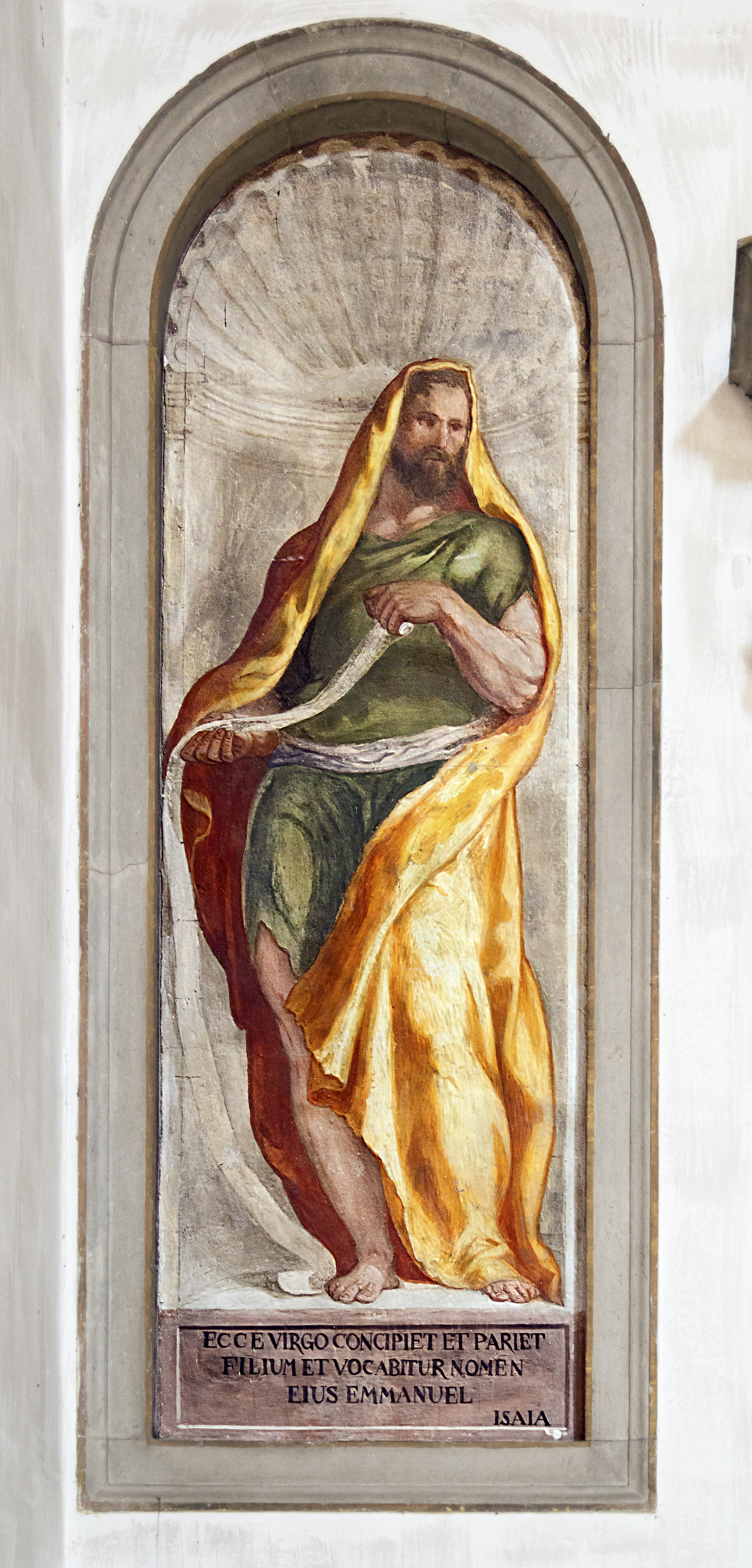
"The prophet Isaiah" by Giuseppe Porta

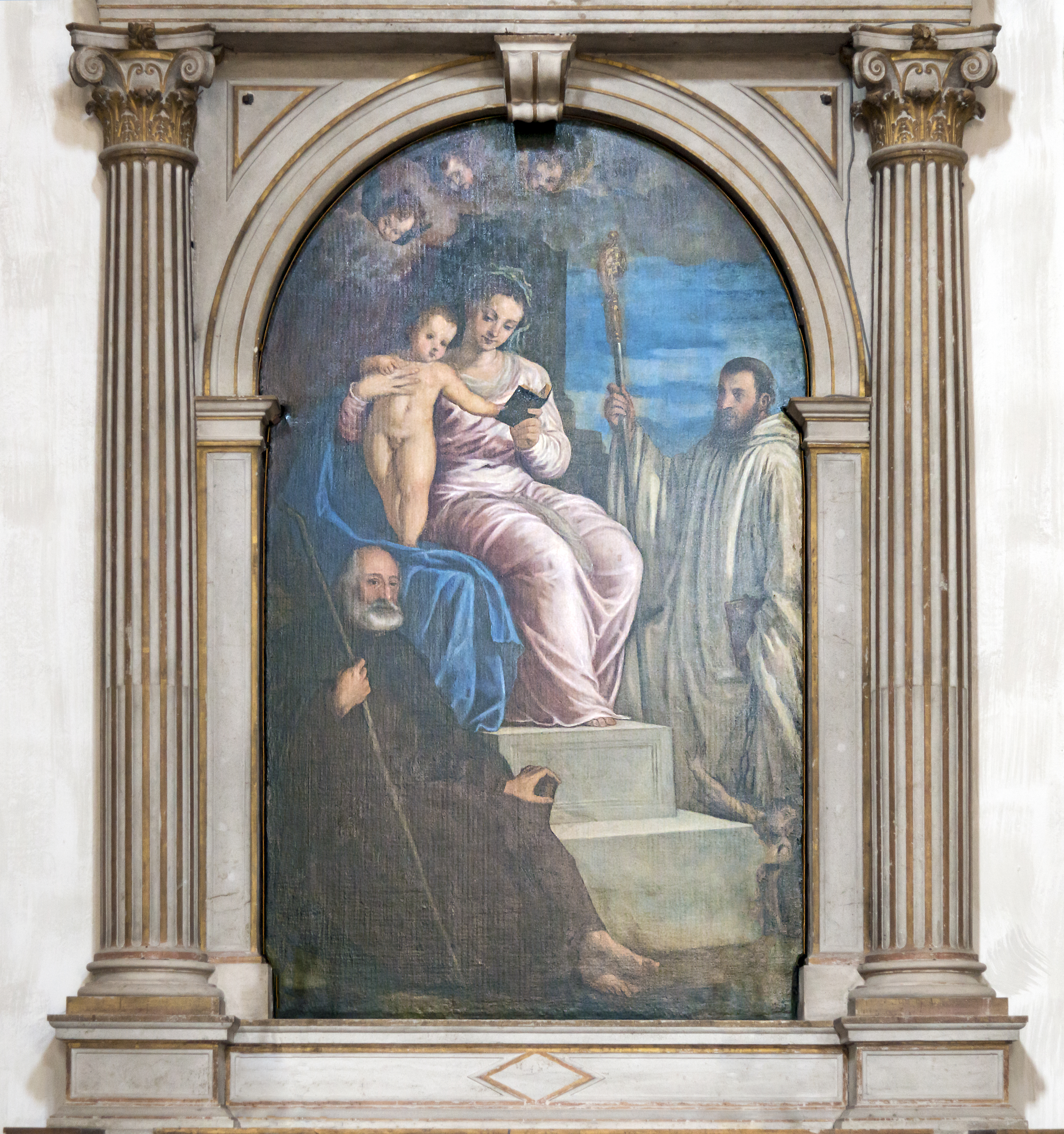
"Virgin and Child with St. Anthony Abbot and St. Bernard." by Giuseppe Porta

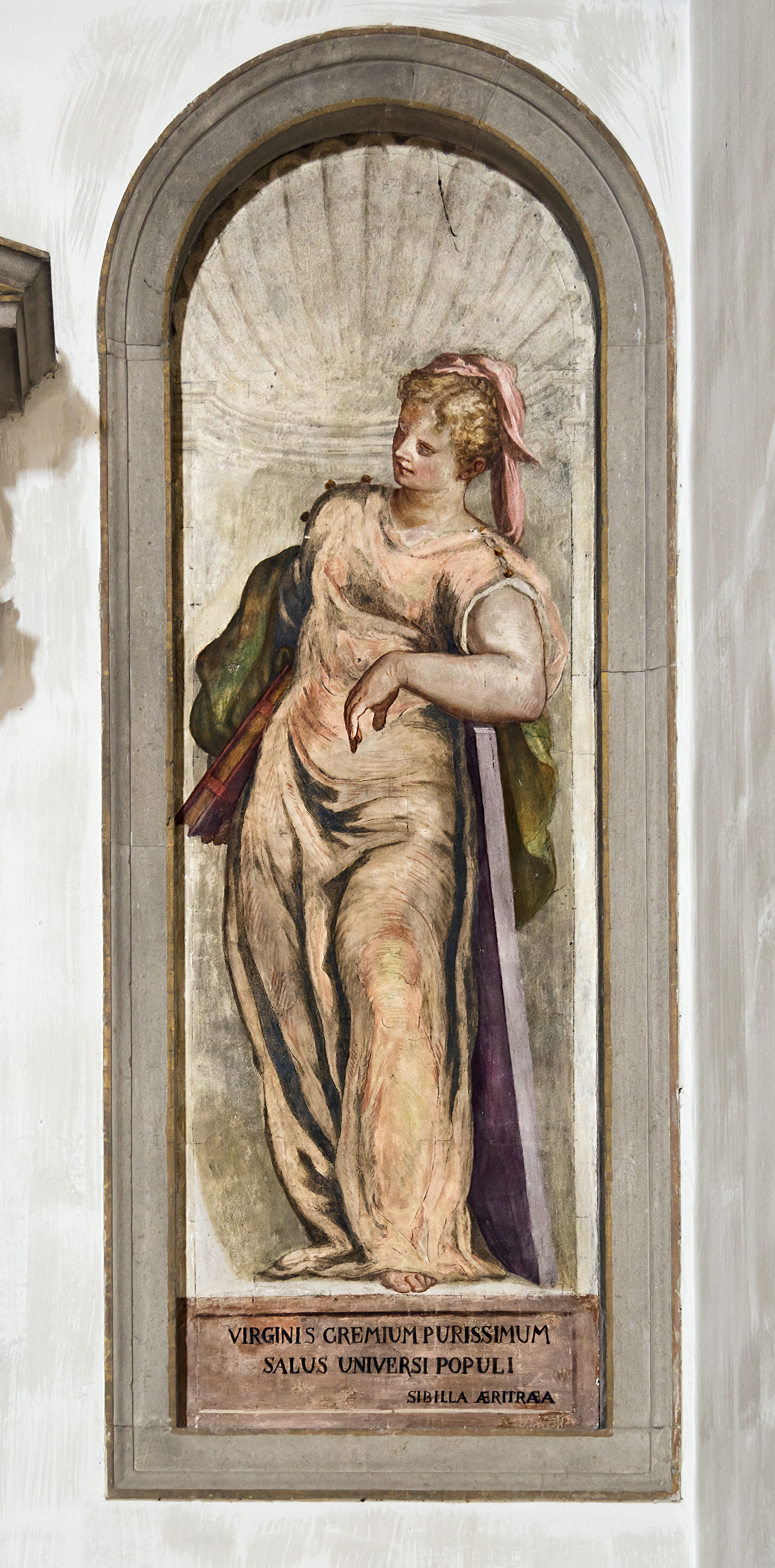
"The Eritrean Sibyl" by Giuseppe Porta

5th left Giustinian or "della Salute"
The chapel has a canvas by Paolo Veronese, depicting Holy Family with St Catherine and Anthony Abbot (circa 1560). One source places the Veronese Resurrection in this chapel.

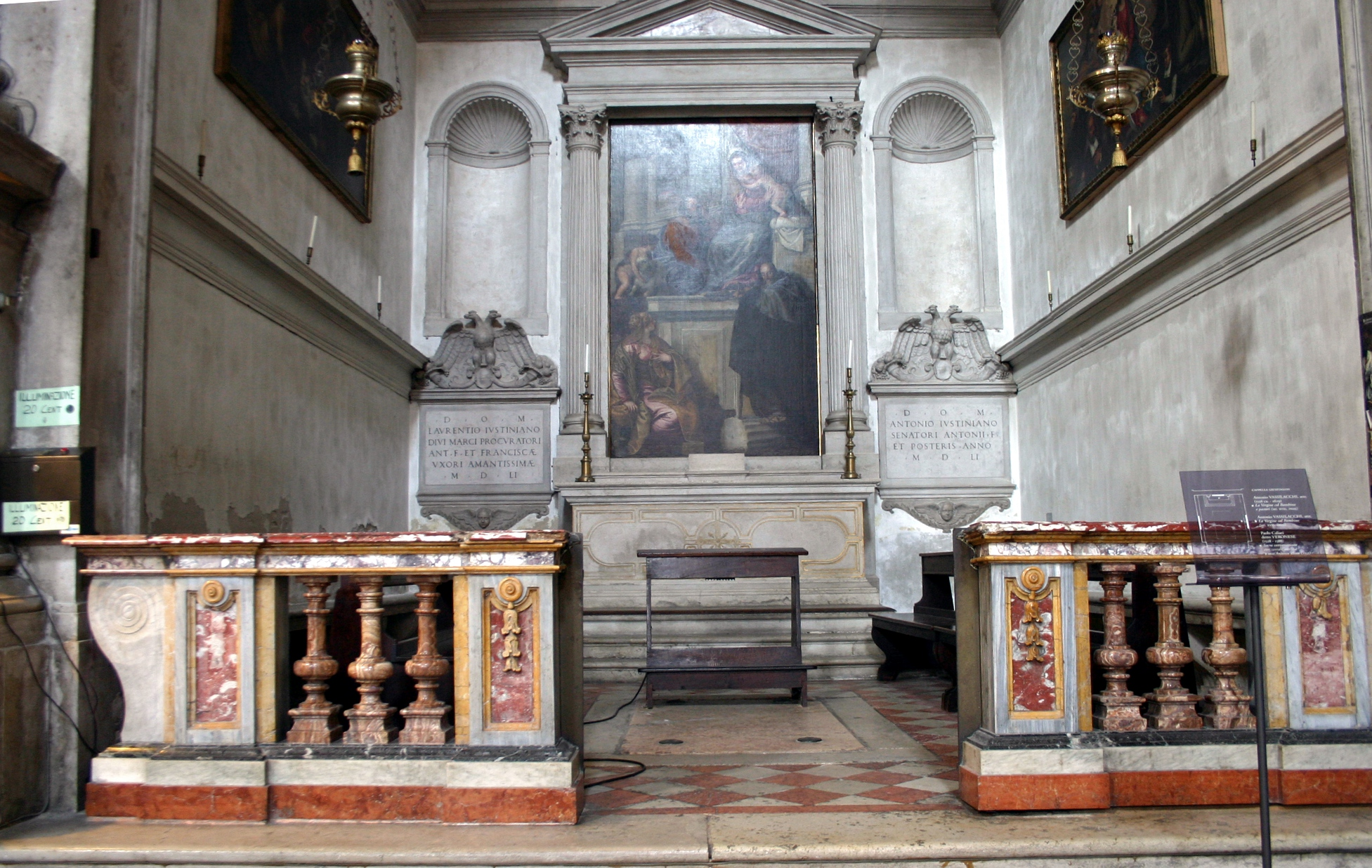
Giustiniani's Chapel

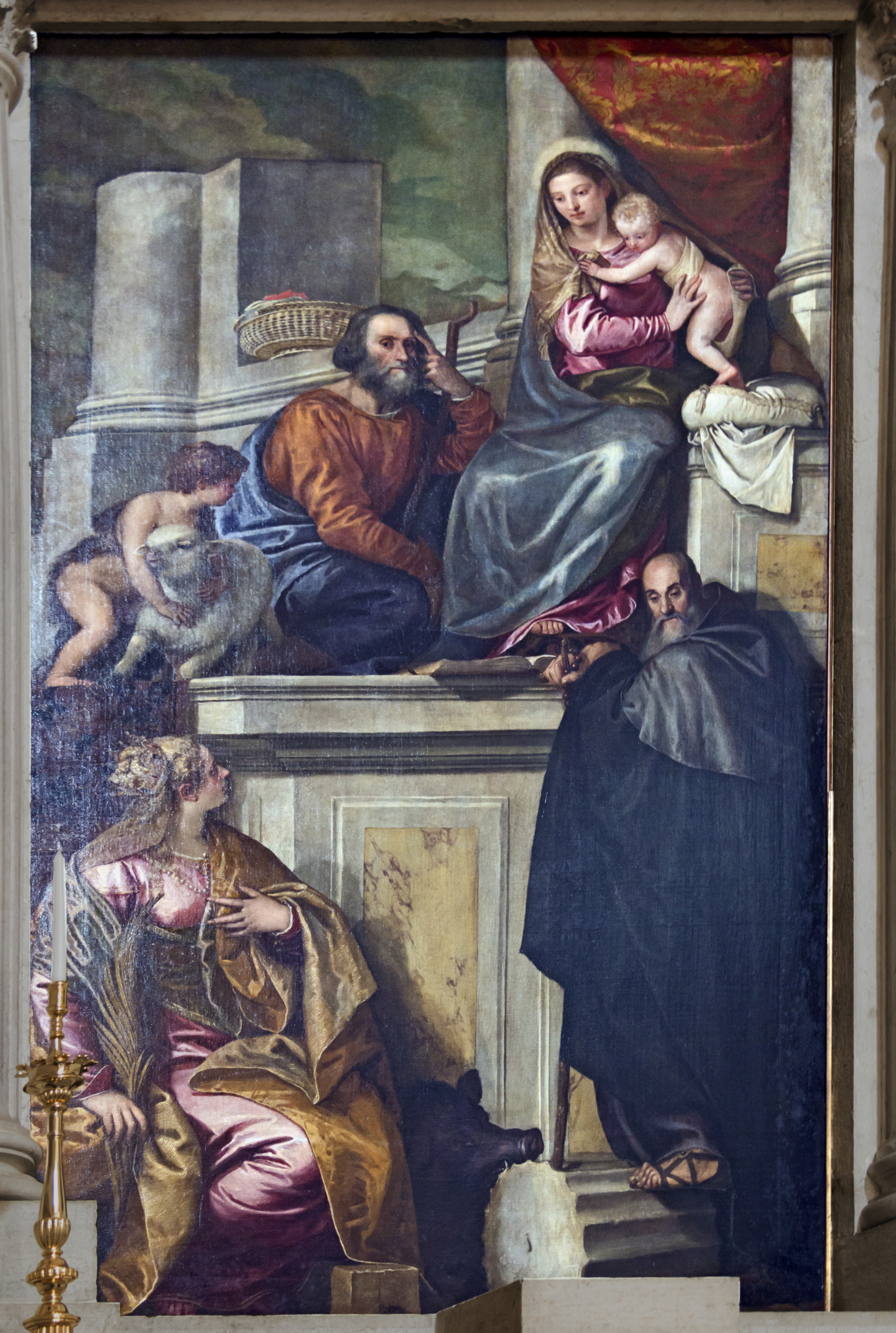
" Holy Family with St. Catherine and St. Anthony Abbot " by Paolo Veronese

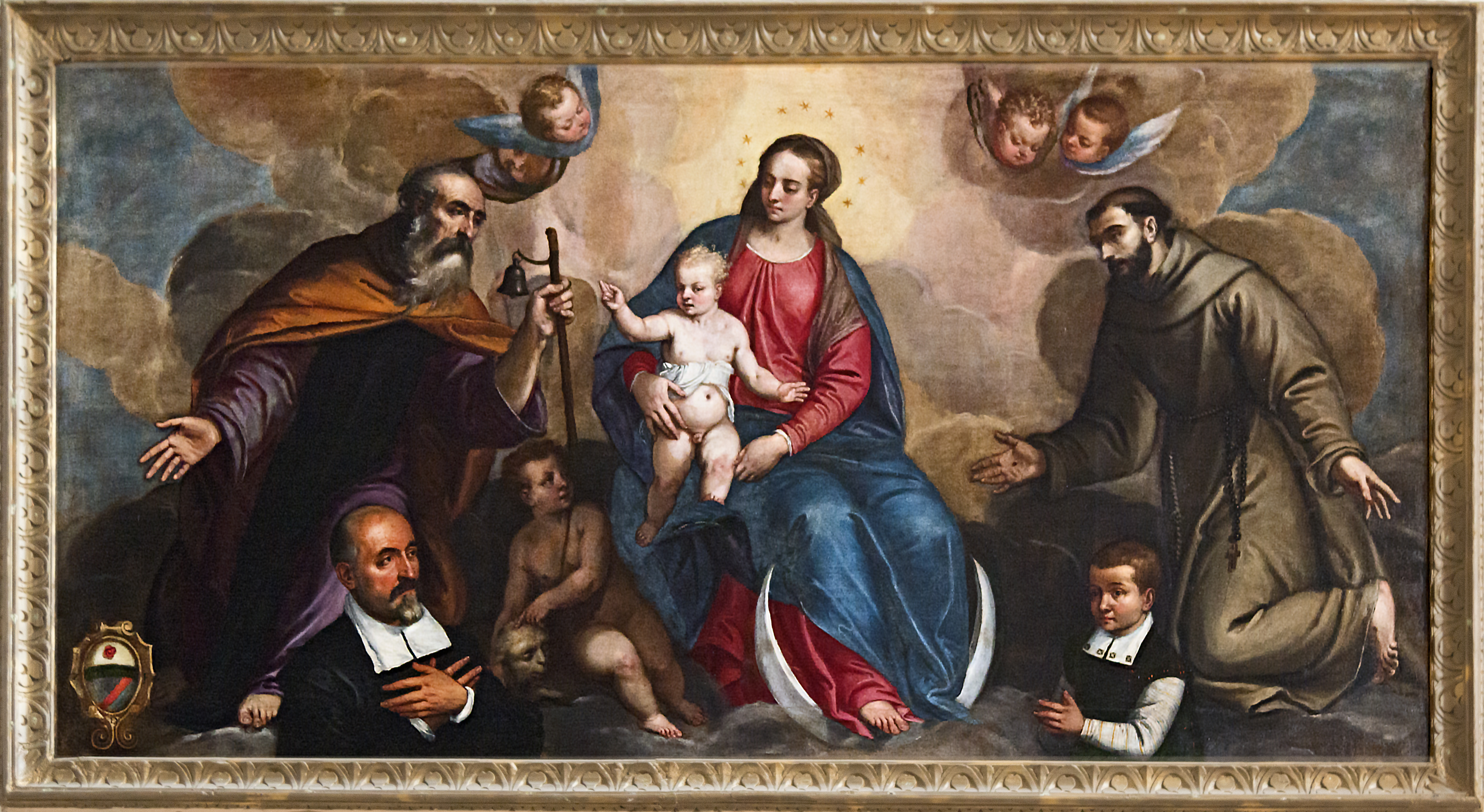
" Virgin and Child " by Antonio Vassilacchi

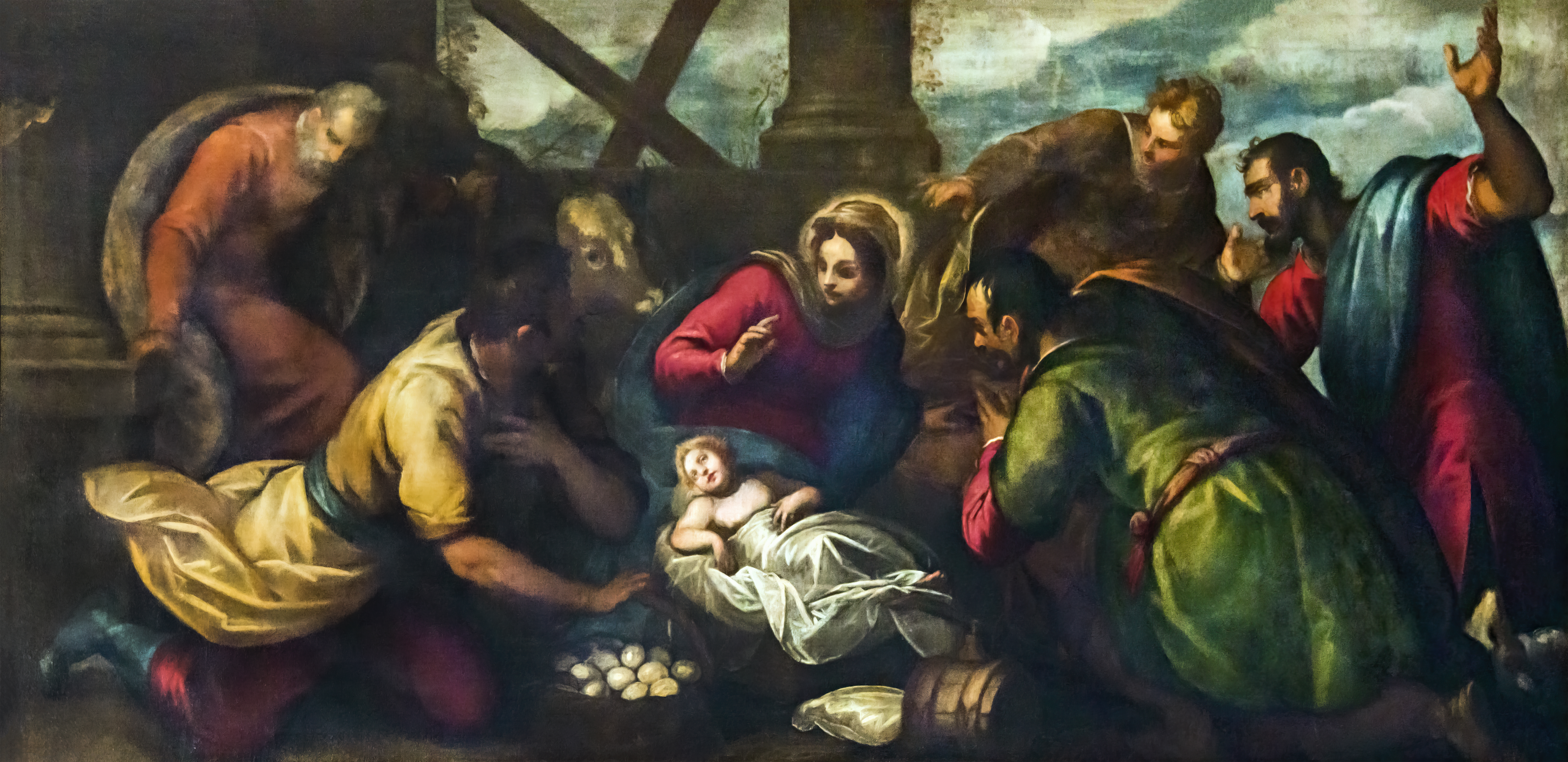
Virgin and Child with the shepherds by Antonio Vassilacchi

=== Transept left ===
Chapel Priuli
Dedicated to the family Priuli and patronized by Pascal Baylon. It is closed by a polychrome marble balustrade of the XVe . On the right wall a painting of an Addolorate XVII attributed to Antonio Vassilacchi. Below in the wall is the stone where Justine of Padua knelt for her martyrdom (comes from the old church of Santa Giustina, now destroyed). The polychrome marble altar is surmounted by a niche in red marble from Verona, where one can see a wooden statue of Pascal Baylon (1691) by Marchiò Molziner (withdrawn in 1898 from the Chapel Giustiniani where it was previously exhibited). On the altar a glass sarcophagus containing the body of Santa Cristina (martyred at 13 years in the year 297) relic deposited here following the destruction of the church Santa Giustina in 1810.
The Monument to the Doge Marcantonio Trevisan
Above the door giving access to the Saint-Chapelle, the sacristy and the cloisters. The Monument is by Girolamo Campagna; The Doge's tomb is in the center of the transept facing the choir. On the right side of the door is a statue of St. Louis of Toulouse.
The Holy Chapel
Accessible from the left arm of the transept, the "Madonna and Child with Four Saints and Donor" of Giovanni Bellini (1507).

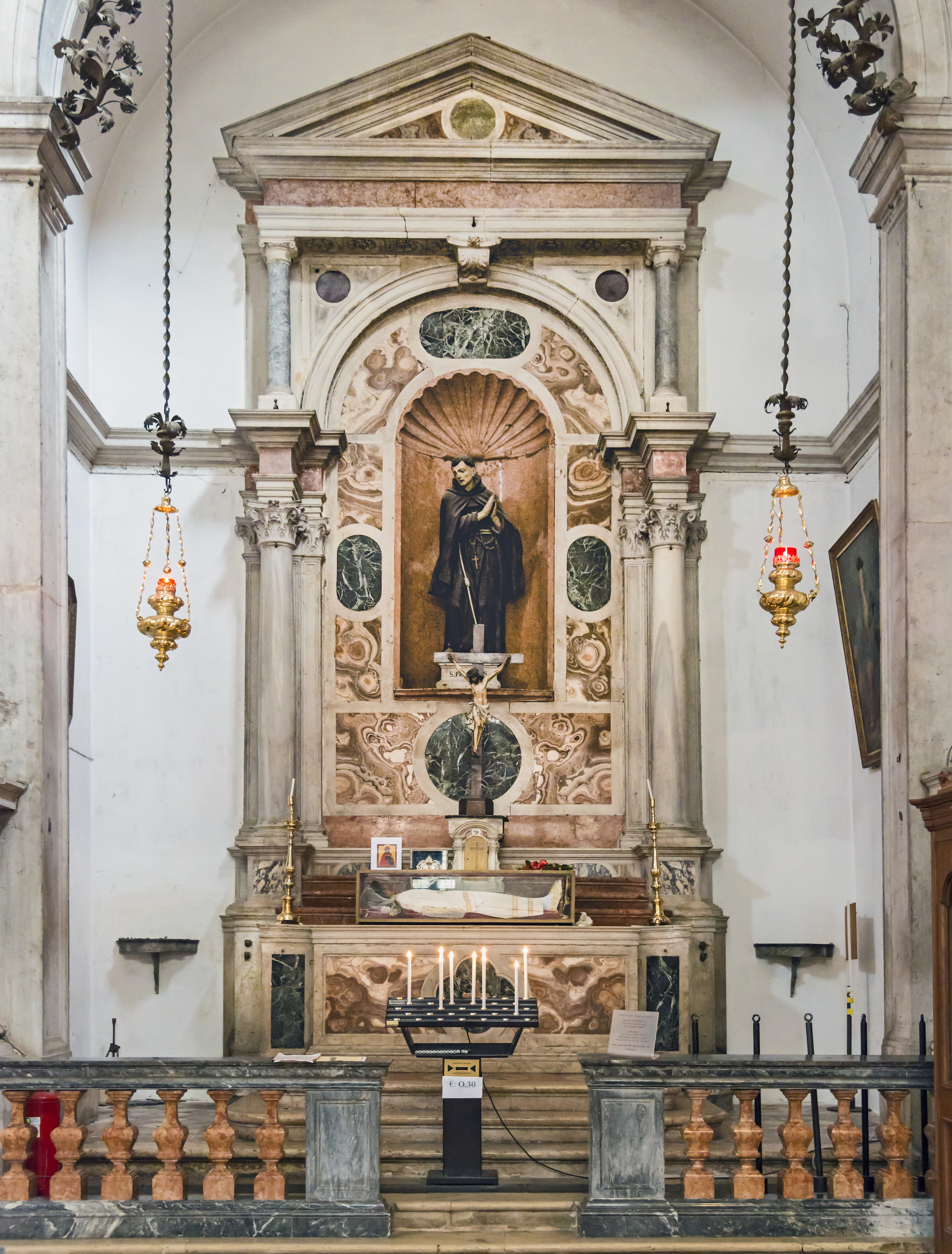
Chapel Priuli

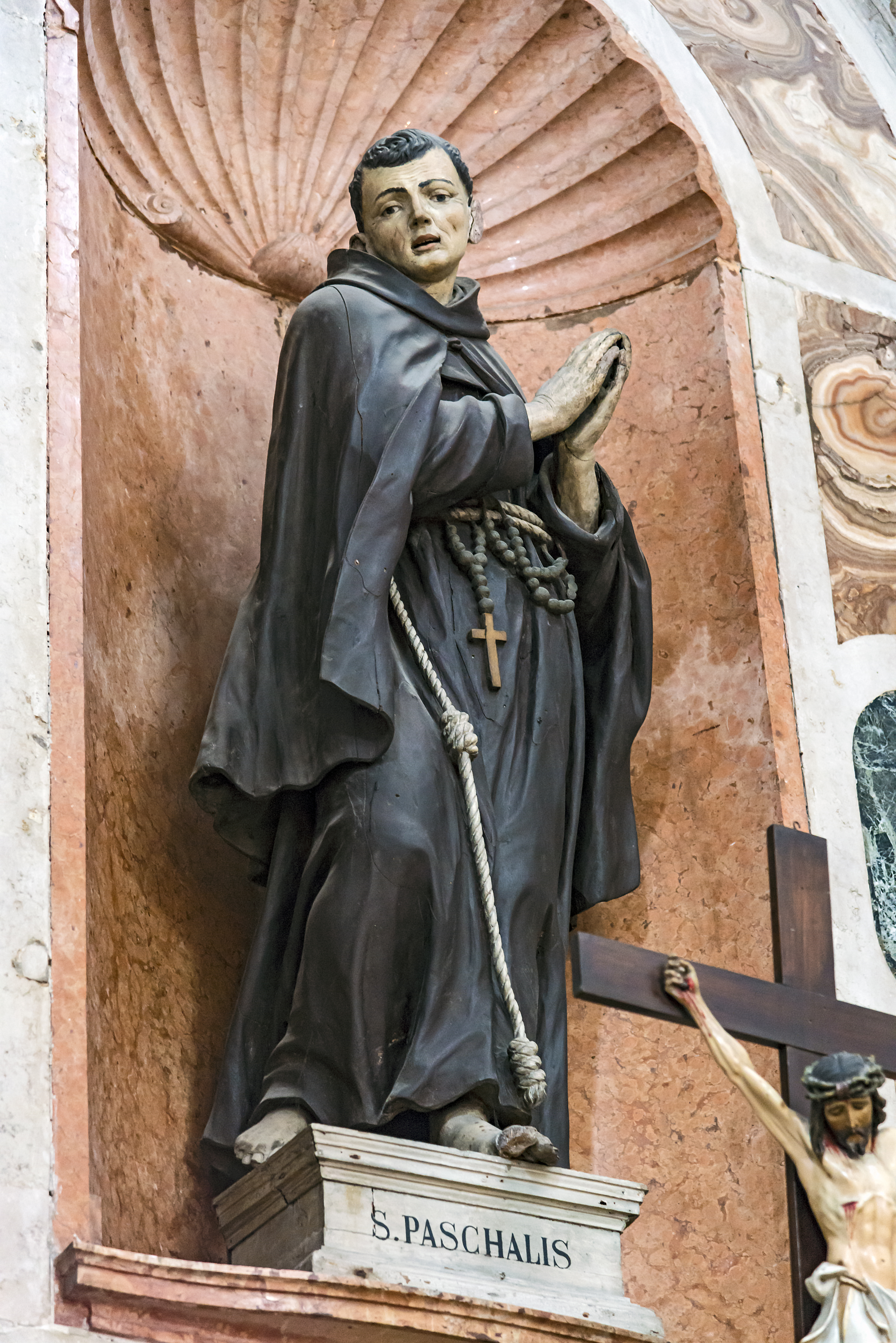
Statue of Pascal Baylon by Marchiò Molziner

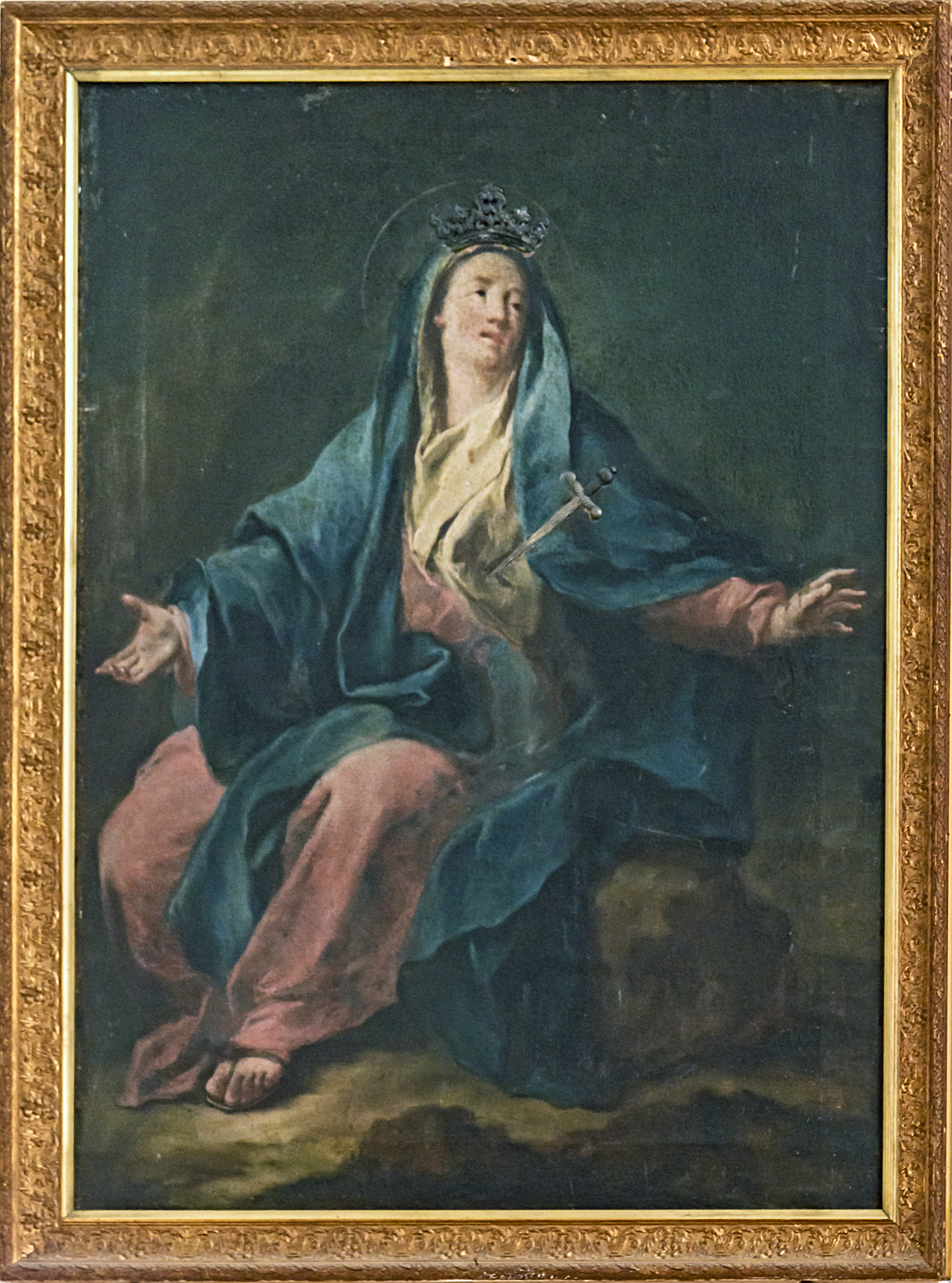
Addolorata by Antonio Vassilacchi

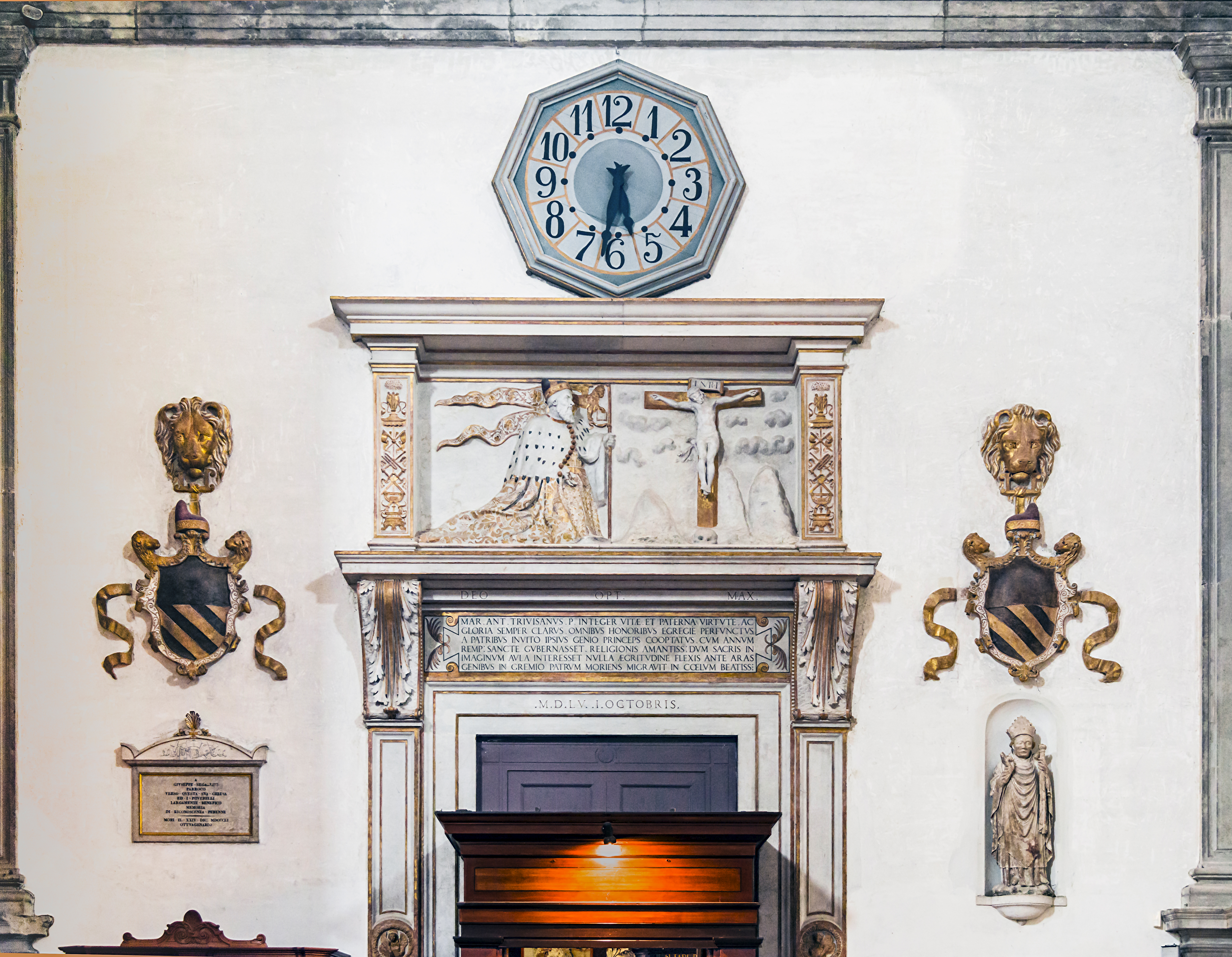
Background of the Left Transept

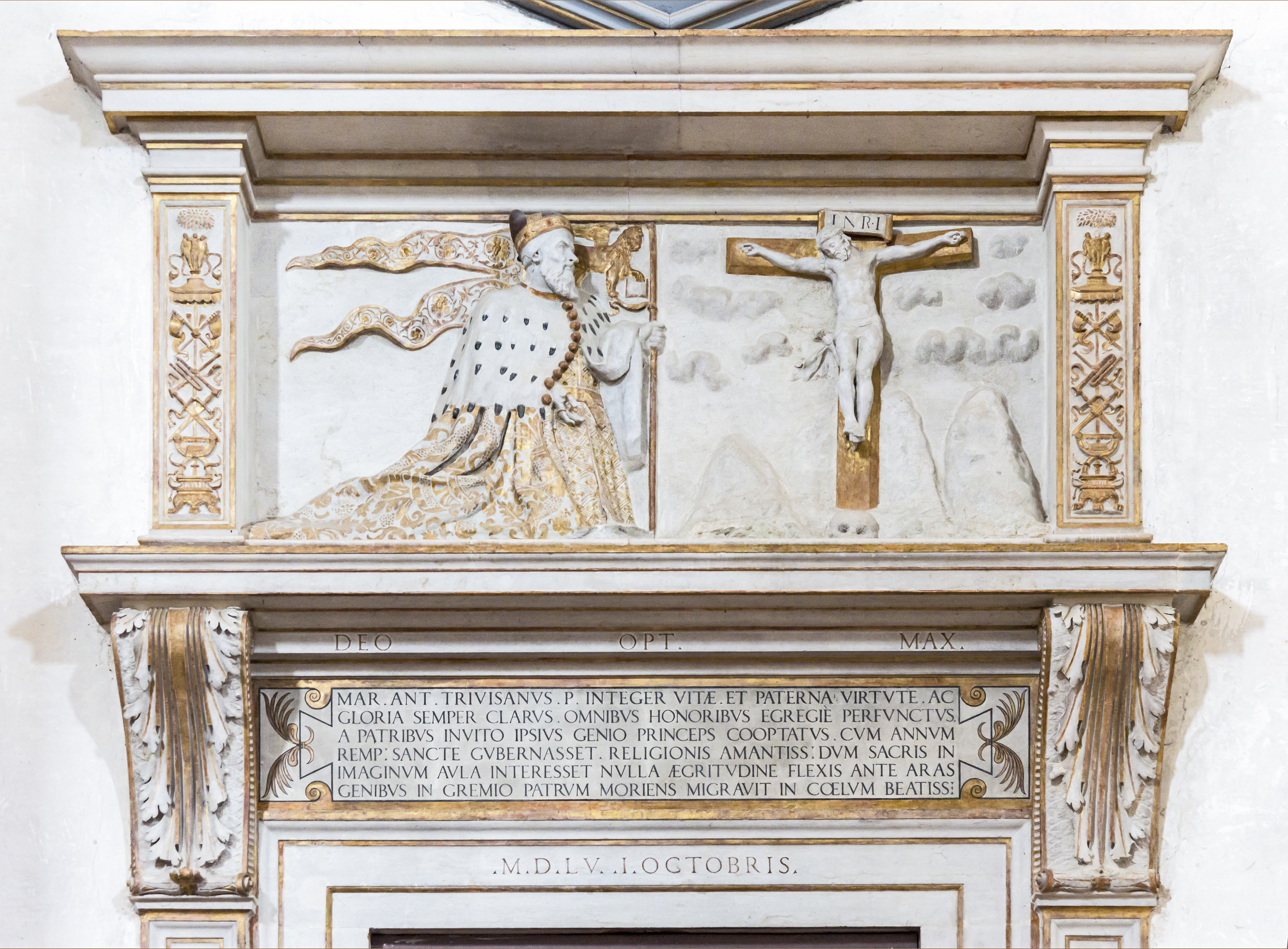
Monument to Marcantonio Trevisan

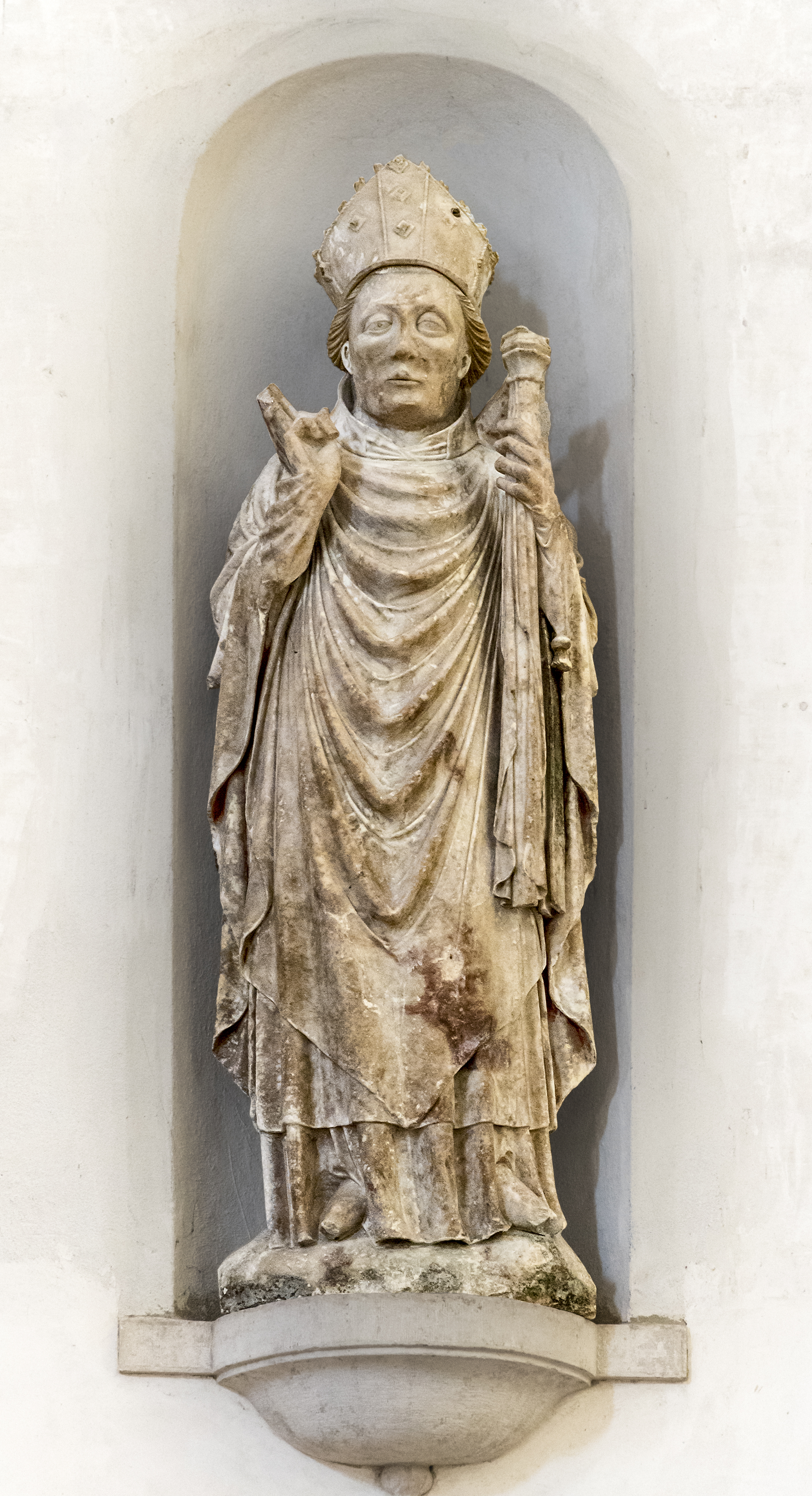
St. Louis of Toulouse

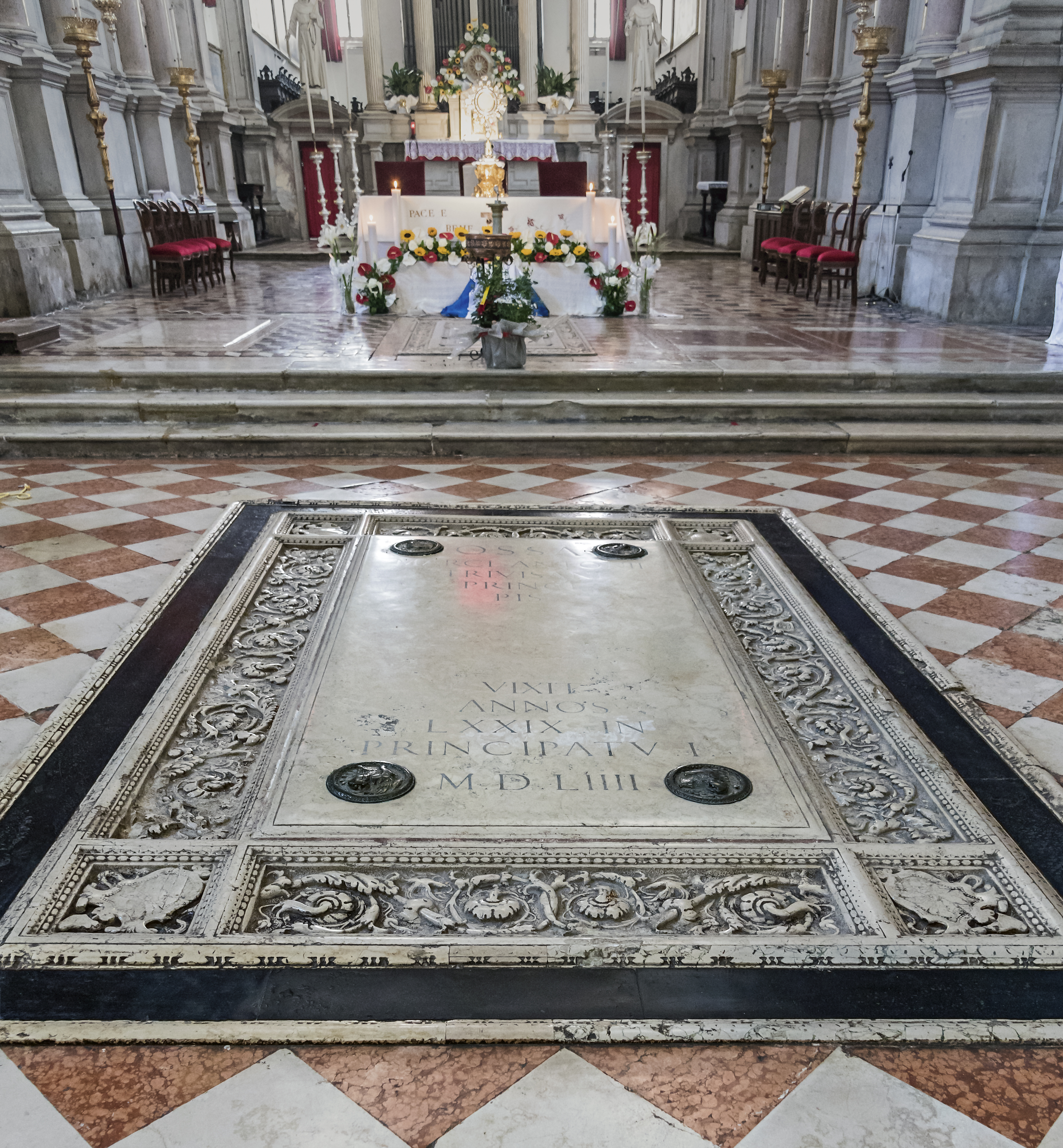
Tomb of doge Marcantonio Trevisan

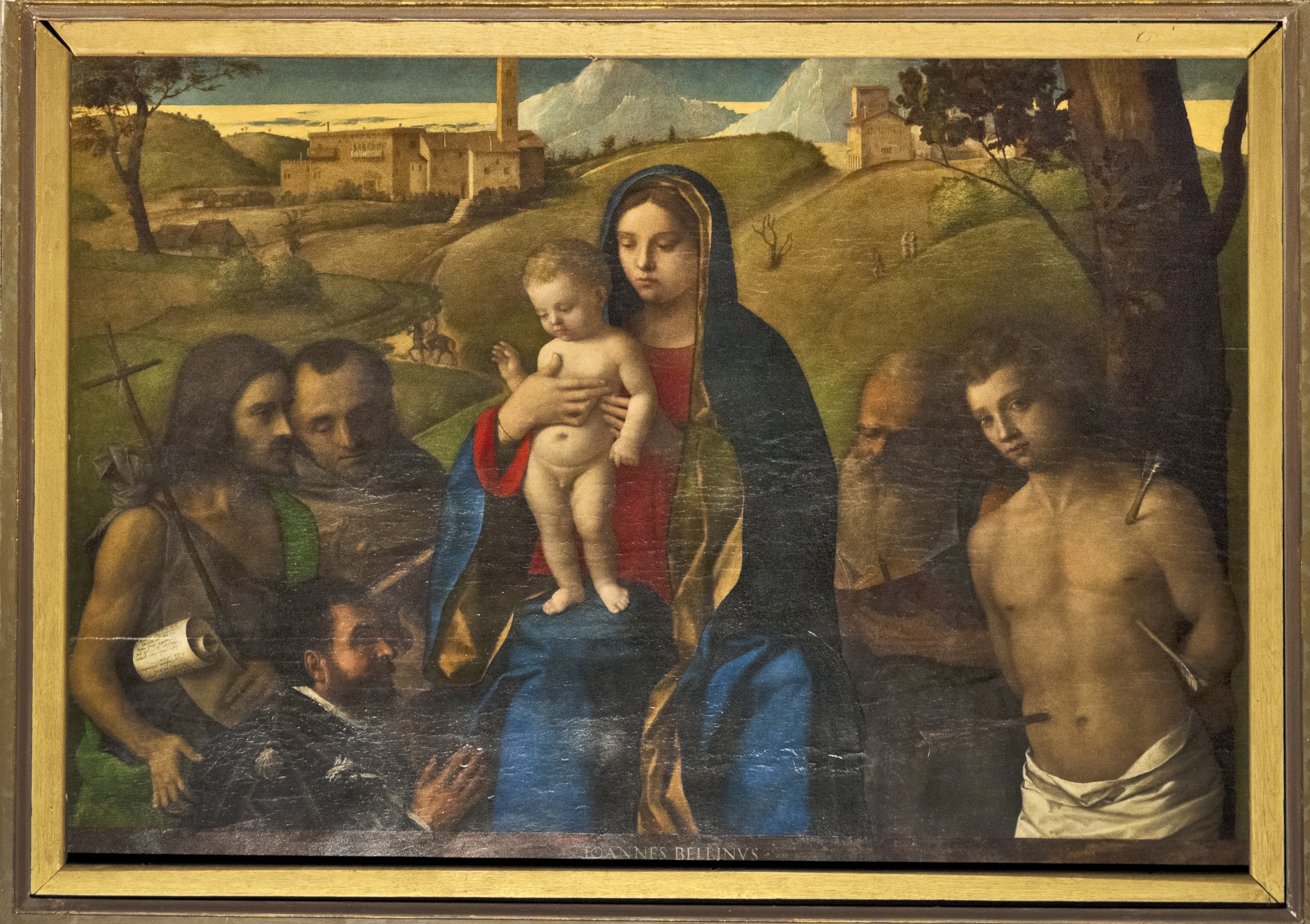
Enthroned Madonna and Saints (1507) by Giovanni Bellini

Sacristy

The Sacristy is organized with a central altar and two laterals. On the left side: The adoration of the mages, a copy of the painting by Federico Zuccari in the Grimani chapel, which is very degraded (oil on marble). This copy was made in 1833 by the painter Michelangelo Grigoletti. On the other side of the left altar are two works by Palma the Younger: San Bonaventura nello studio and San Diego de Alcalá in estasi. The central altar shows a painting by Giuseppe Angeli (1709-1798) The immacolata e santi of 1760. On the right side of the altar a door of John of Capistrano painted around 1710 by Nicola Grassi. From the same author on the right side Antony of Padua. The altar of right is attributed to Sansovino in 1559. On the wall of entrance on the left side The Communion of San Bonaventura (Bonaventure of Bagnoregio) by Nicola Grassi and on the left San Francesco comfortato dall'angelo of the same author.

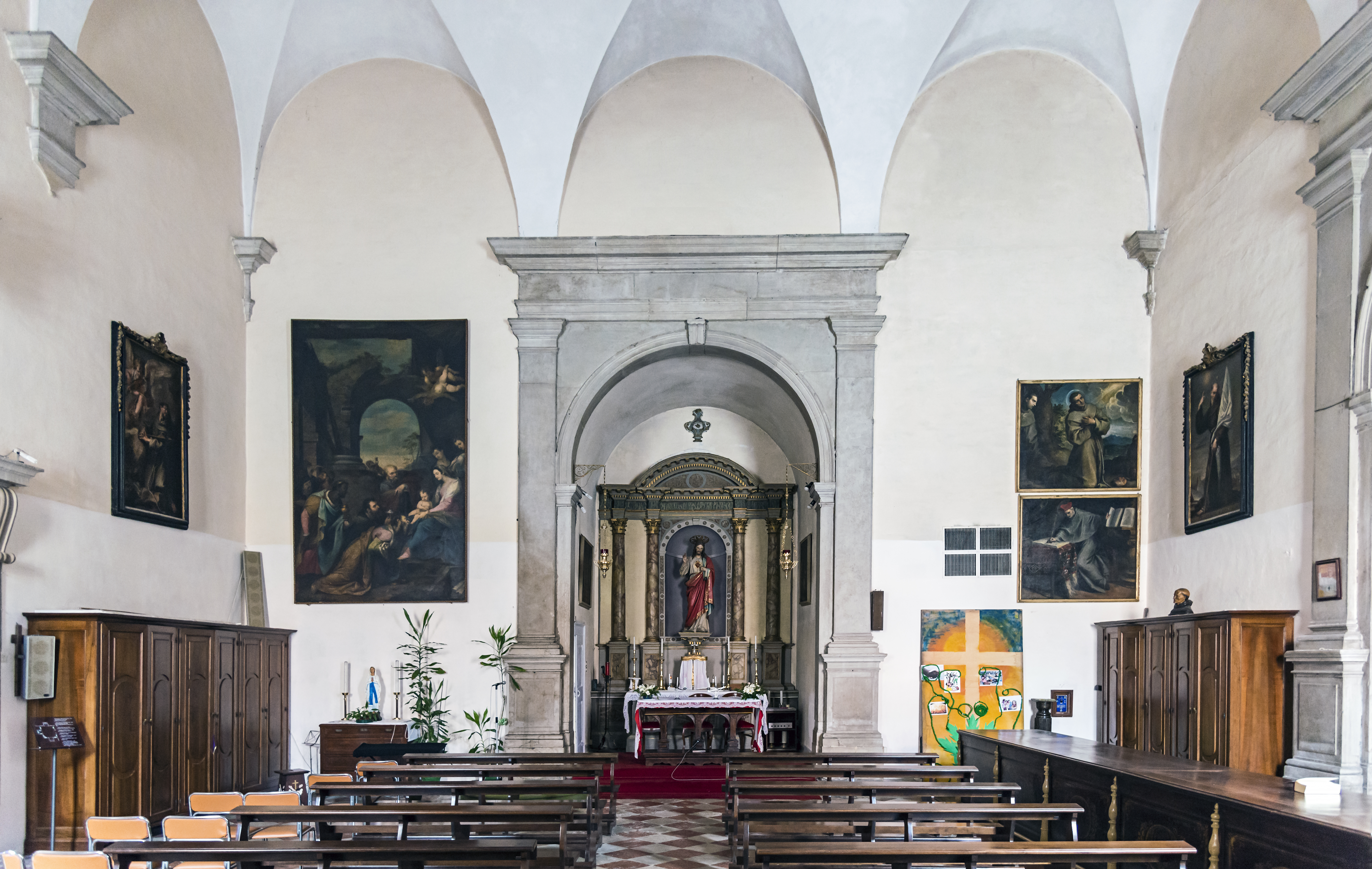
Côté gauche de la sacristie

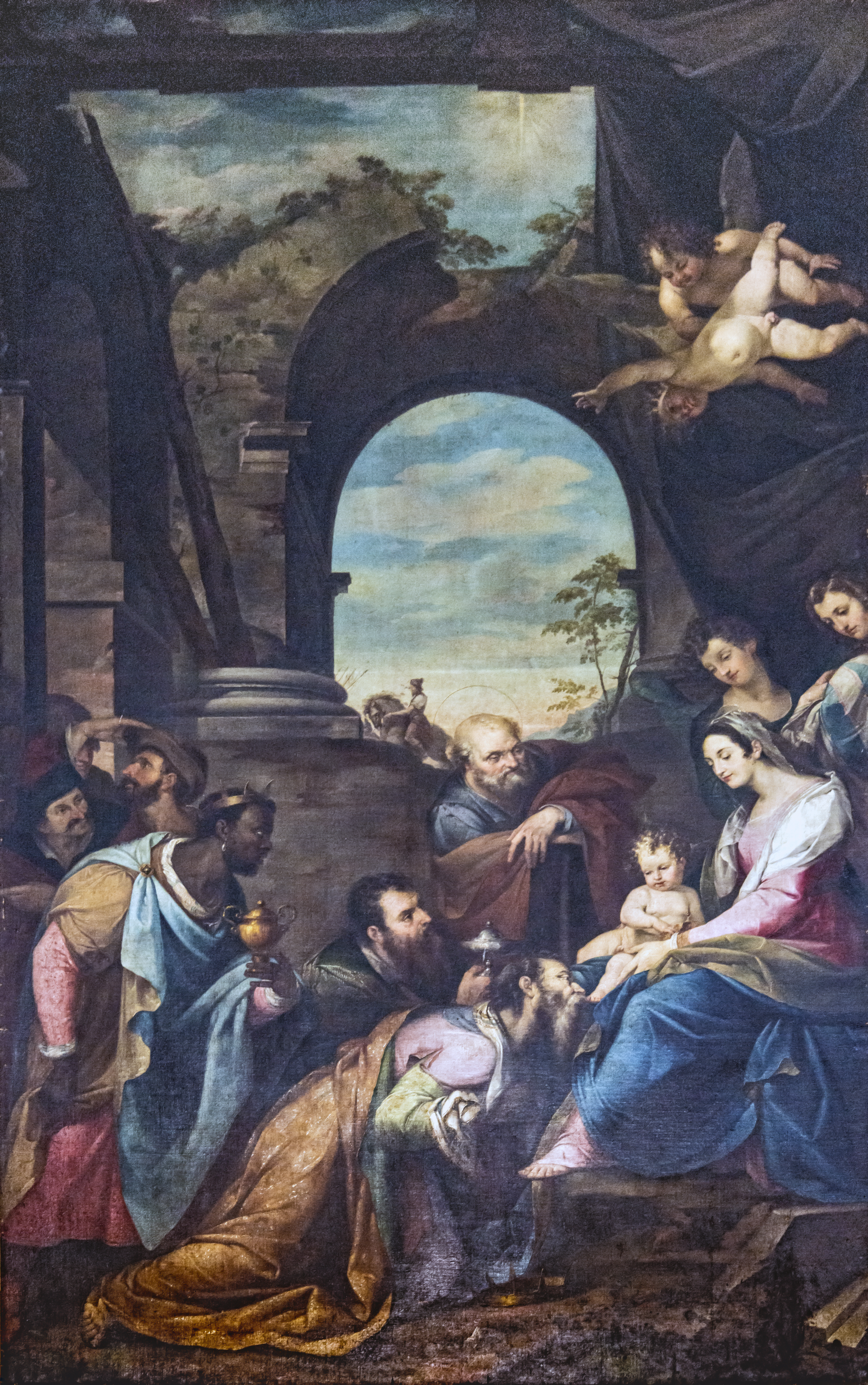
The adoration of the mages Michelaongelo Grigoletti

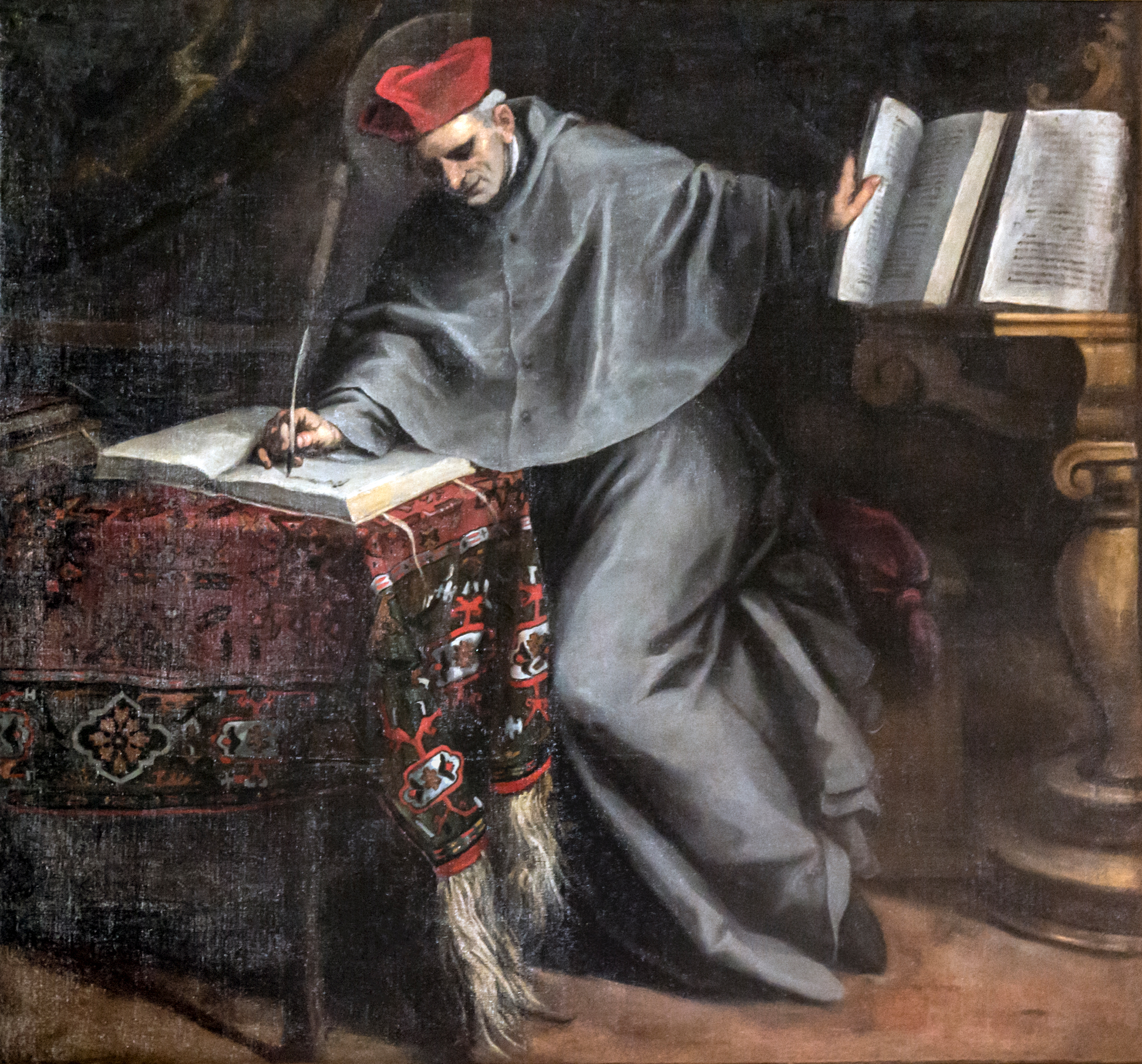
San Bonaventura nello studio

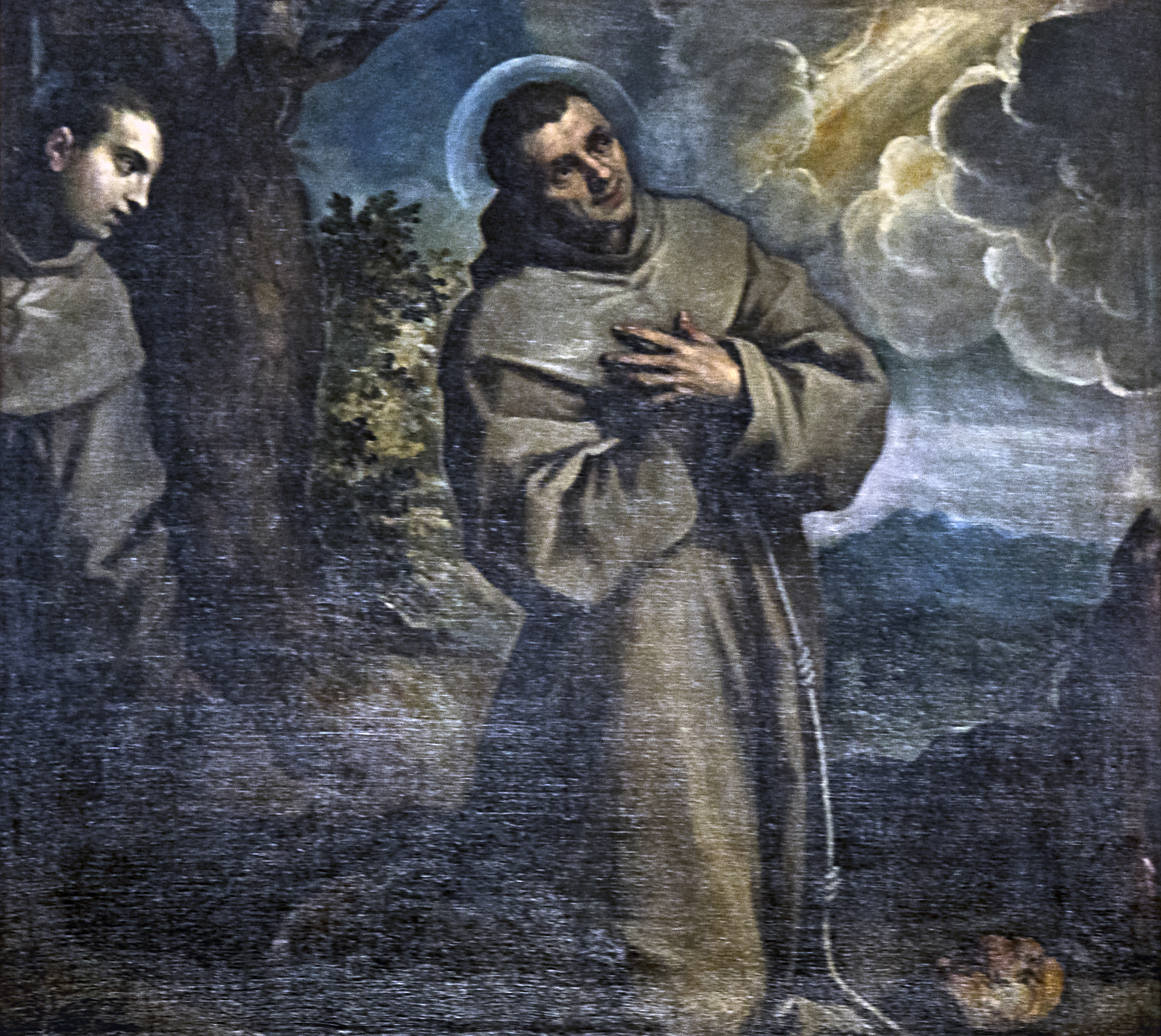
San Diego de Alcalá in estasi

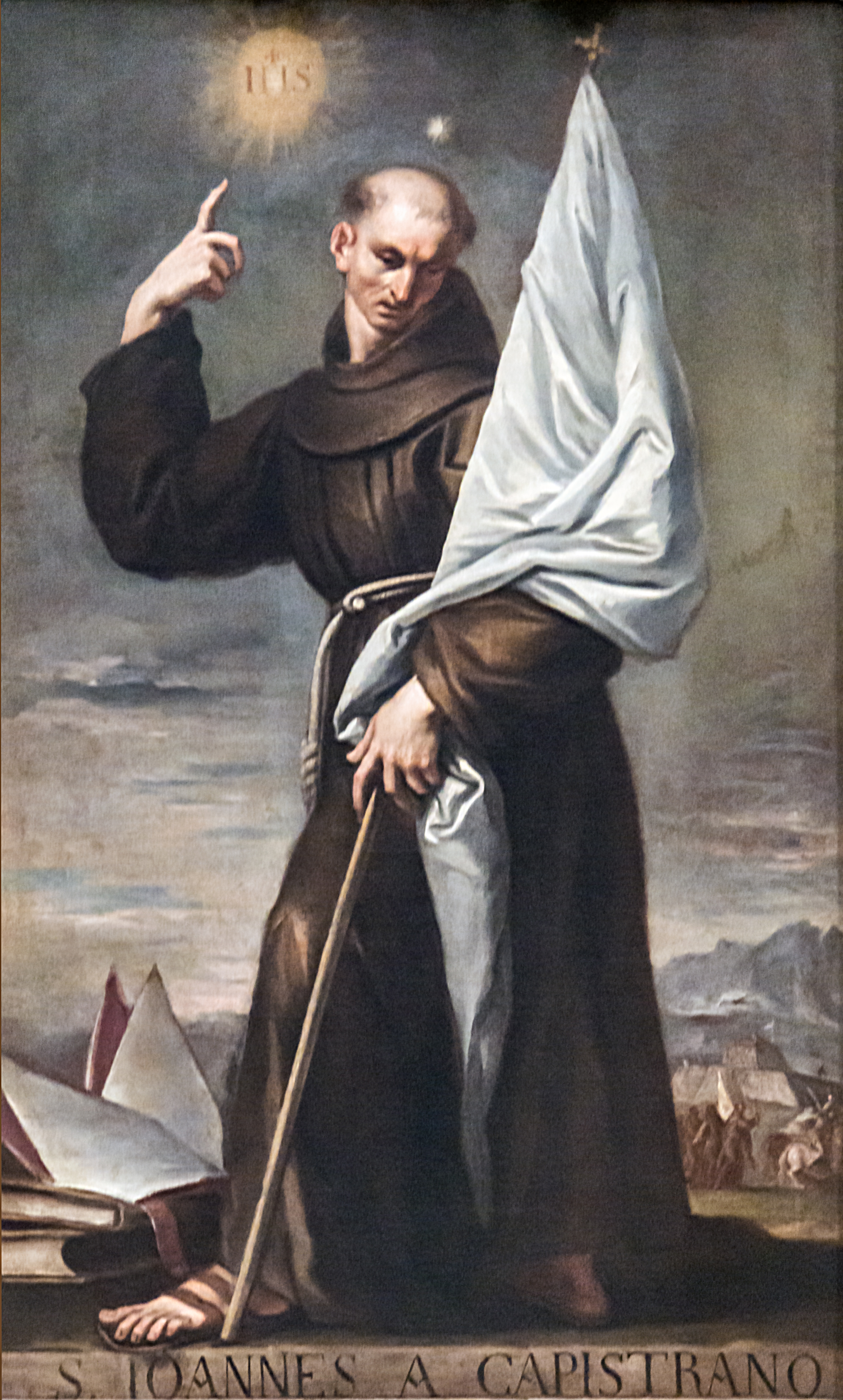
John of Capistrano Nicola Grassi

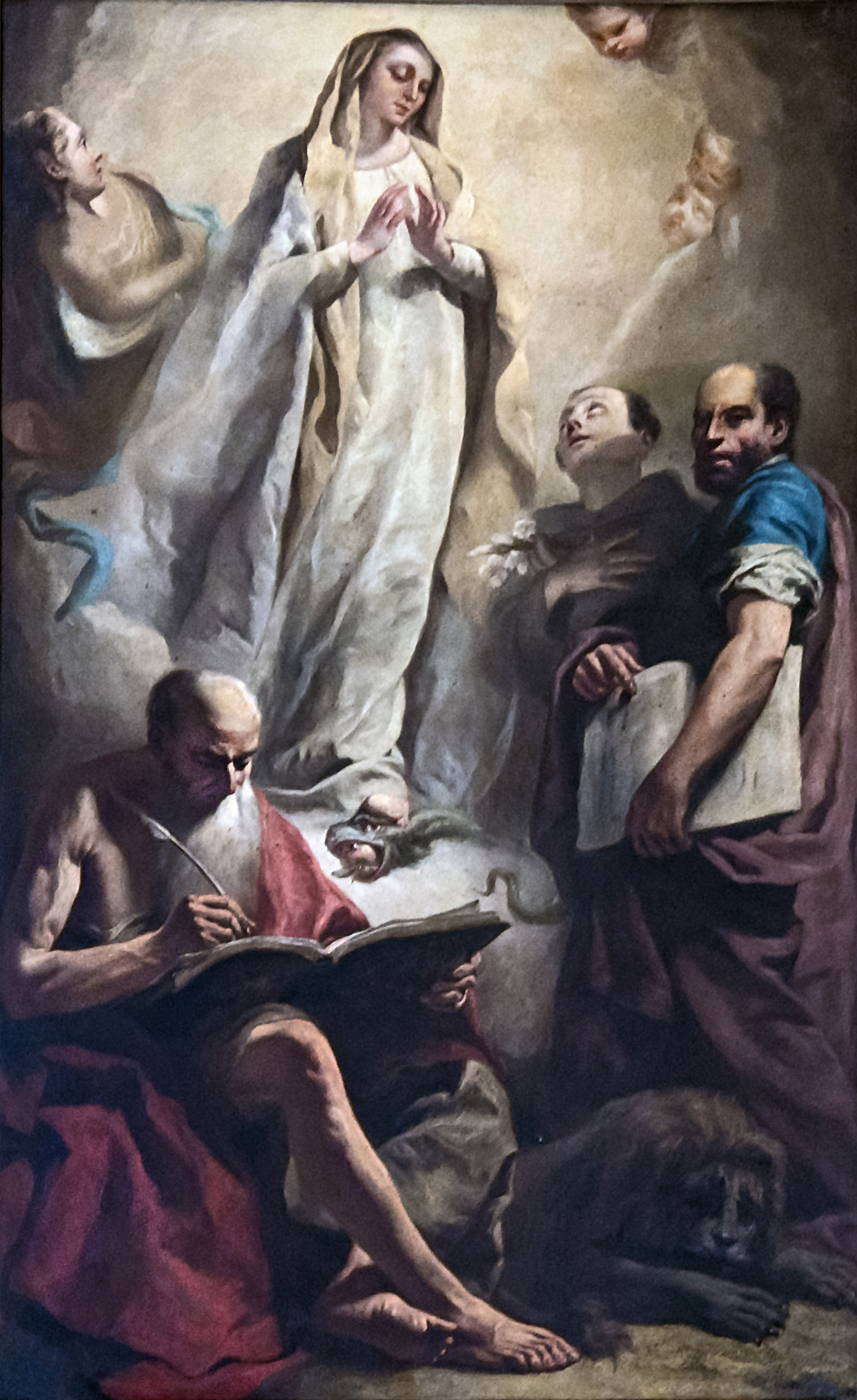
The immacolata e santi

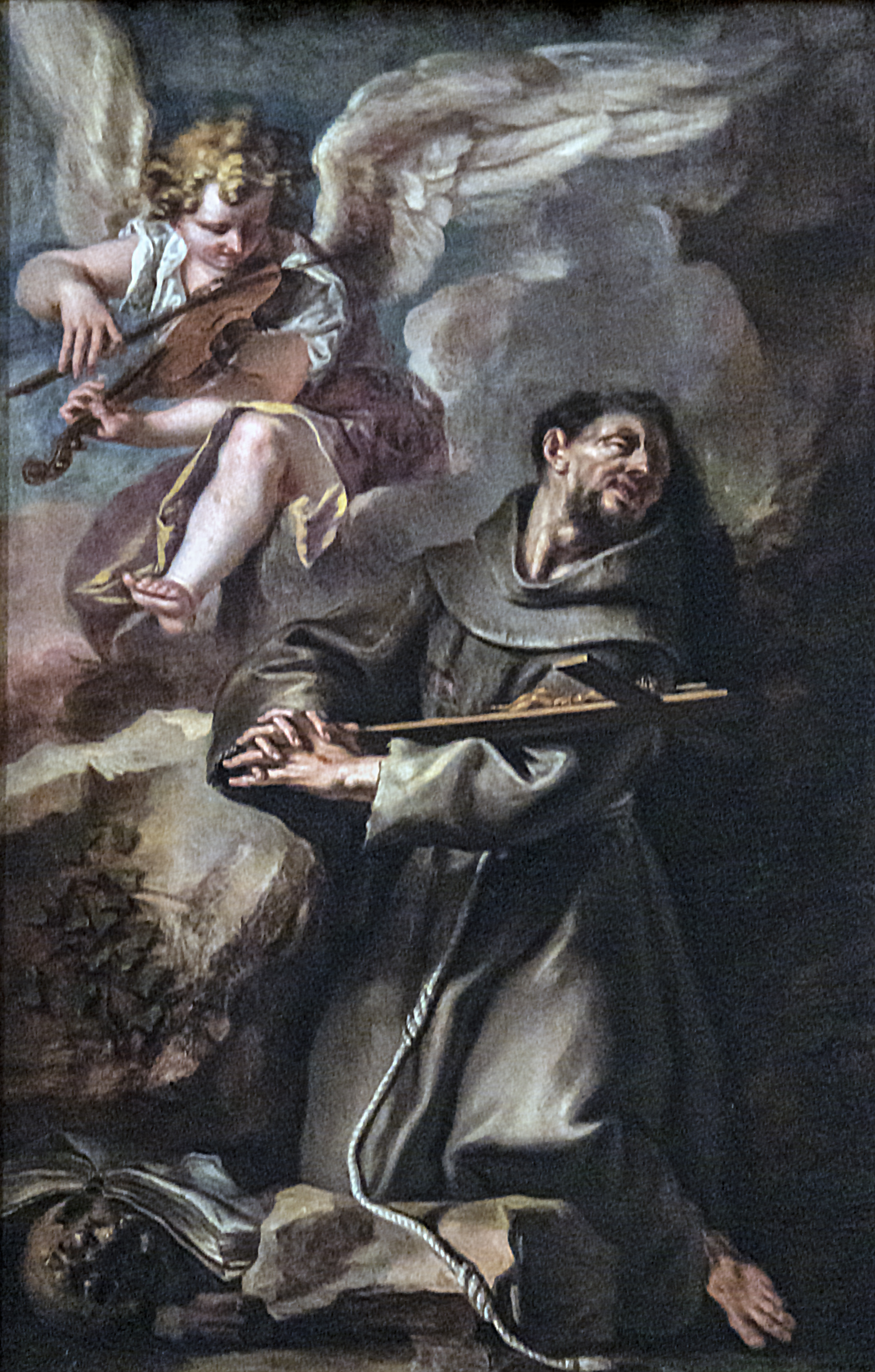
San Francesco comfortato dall'angelo

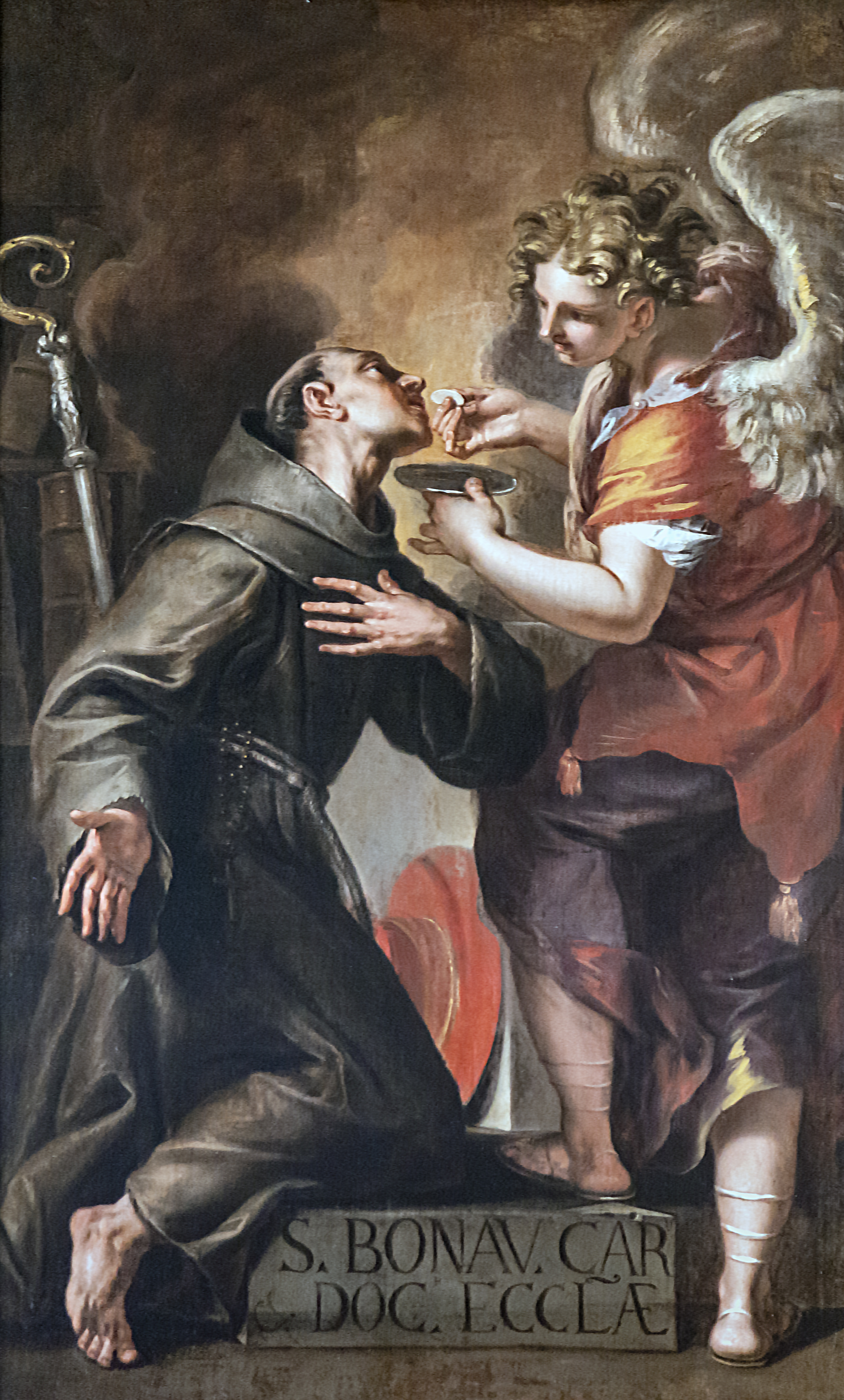
The Communion of San Bonaventura

Left of apse choir, Badoer-Giustinian
In the late 15th century, the noble Venetian Girolamo Badoer commissioned a carved choir screen and altarpiece for their family chapel, dedicated to St. Jerome. Its construction was completed in 1509.
In 1534, Jacopo Sansovino was commissioned to rebuild the church. Agnesina Badoer Giustinian (c. 1472–1542), the Badoer heiress who had married into the Giustinian family, asked that the earlier works by the Lombardo family be incorporated into the new chapel.
Agnesina and her children are buried here as well as her second husband, procurator Girolamo Giustinian (1470–1532).

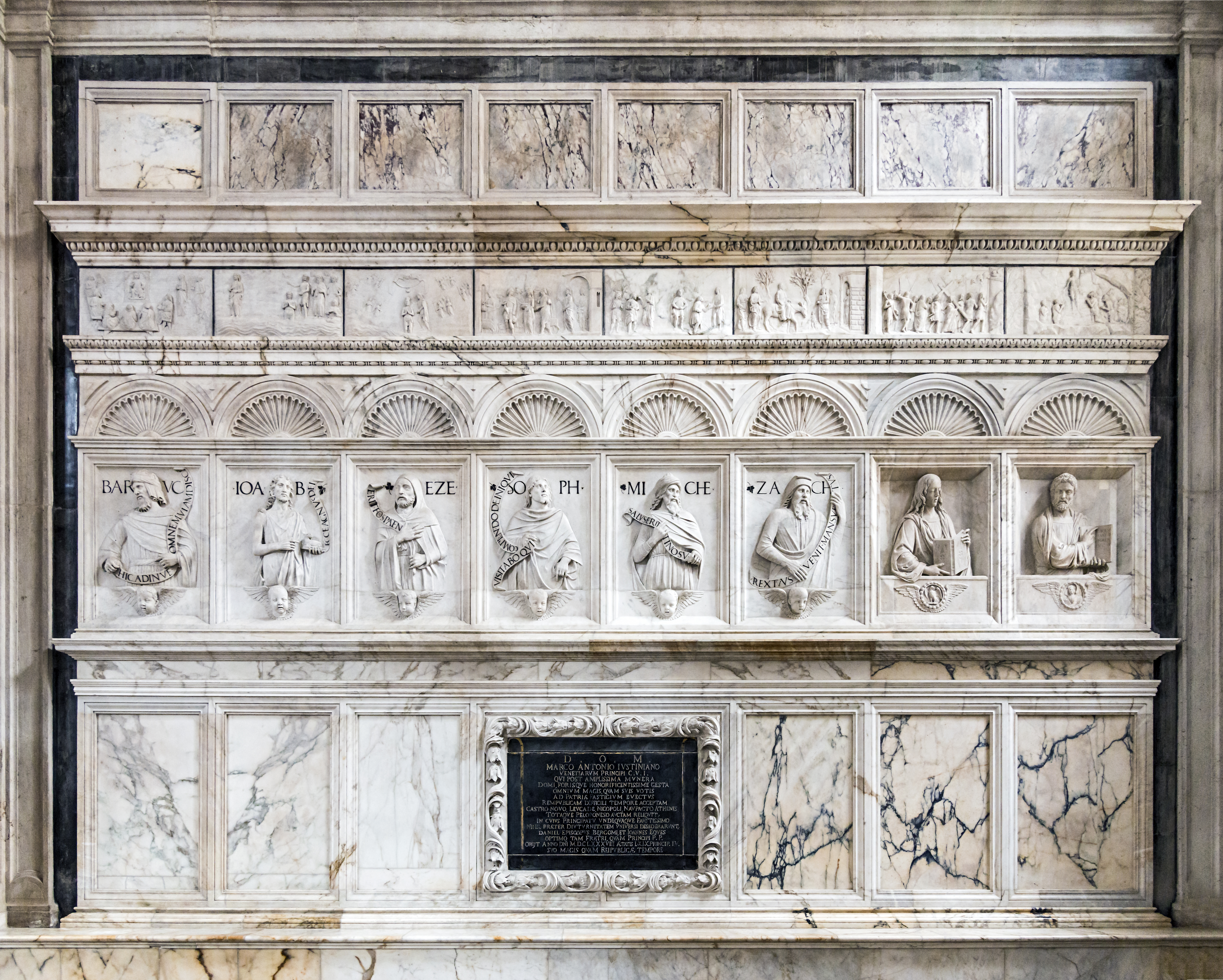
Left wall

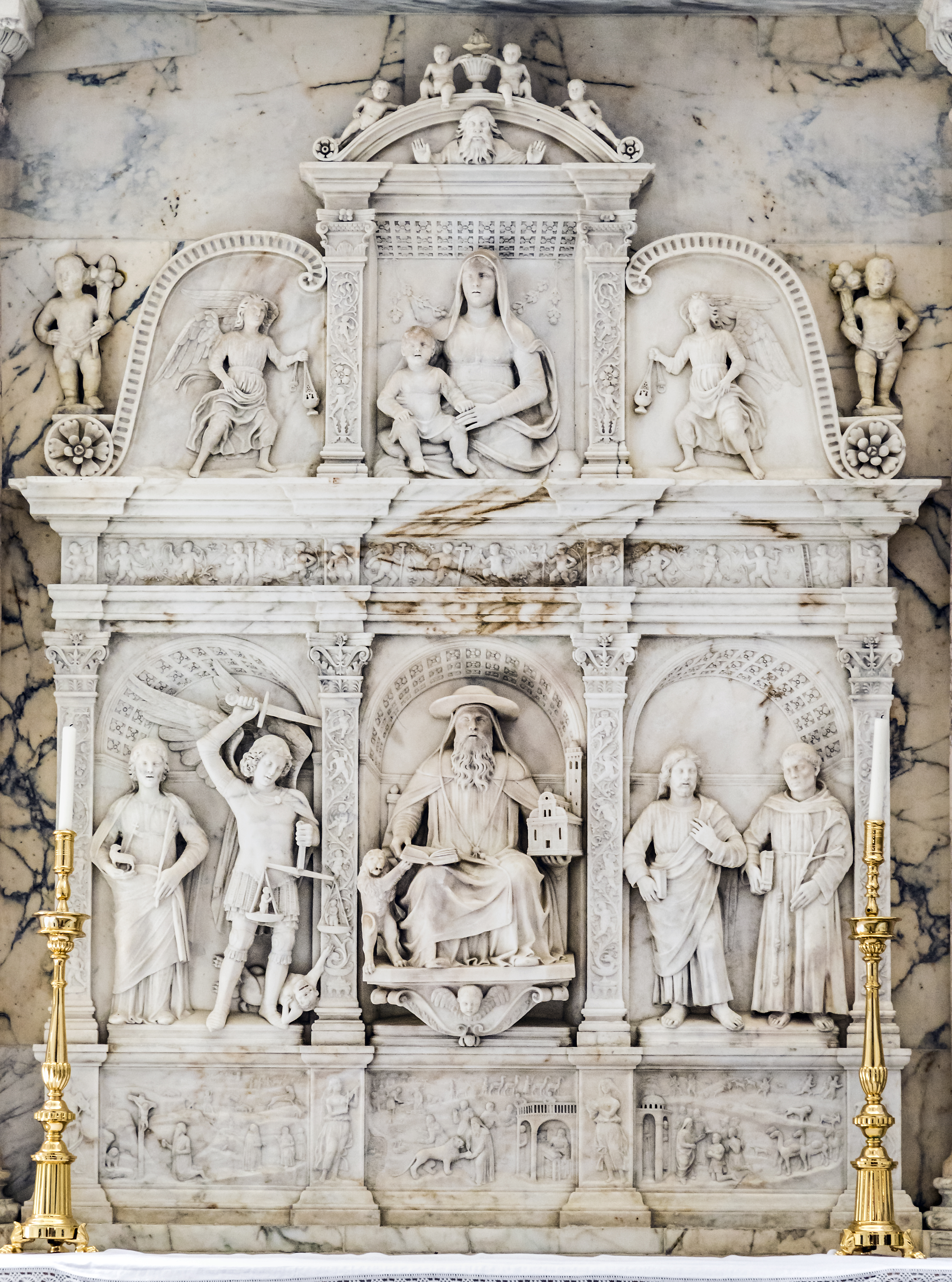
Altar piece

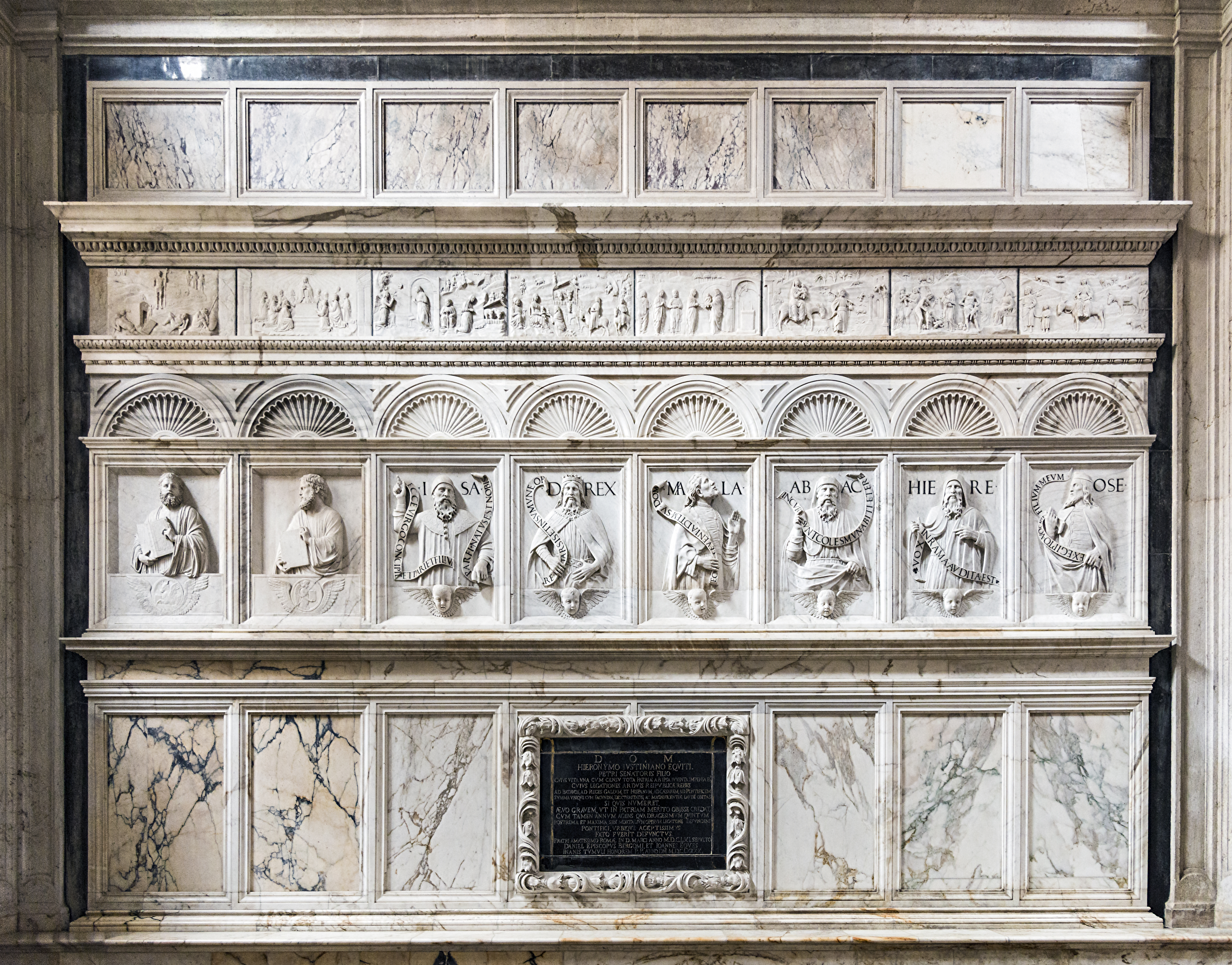
Right Wall

- Right Wall: Below, a funeral inscription from 1690. Above it (level 2): bas-reliefs from the 15th century: Two evangelists by Tullio Lombardo and Amedeo Lombardo, followed by six prophets of Pietro Lombardo (fifteenth century). Level 3: christological cycle by Pietro Lombardo.
- The altar: the frontal shows the last judgment; the altarpiece is a marble triptych of St. Jerome and four saints, with pilasters separating the arches, the friezes and the pediments, by the Lombardo family.
- Left wall: Below: funeral inscription from 1688. Above it (level 2), six prophets, then two evangelists. Level 3: the christological cycle. All are by Pietro Lombardo.
In 1999, the Badoer-Giustinian Chapel underwent conservation treatments funded by the non-profit organization Save Venice Inc.

=== Choir ===
The choir is complex, with a lateral vestibule on either side of the liturgical choir and a choir of brothers. The two are separated by the main altar and a partition. On each side, an apsidal chapel. On the right side of the vestibule is a picture by Palma il giovane: the flagellation; below, an icon (tempera on wood), anonymous work of the end of the XIVth century: Madonna dell'Umiltà .

- On the left wall, the funerary monument and the epitaph of the doge Andrea Gritti (died in 1538), a work of the Palladian school of the mid-16th century. On the right wall is the monument of Senator Tridiano Gritti, who died in 1474.
- The high altar: The design and the sculptures are attributed to Girolamo Campagna in the second half of the XVIth. Initially the two groups of four wooden columns contained the statues of Francis of Assis and Antony of Padua. The center has the unusual characteristic of not having an altarpiece, but a cross. In 1649 Baltasarre Longhena was commissioned to modify the altar. Above the eight Corinthian columns it has set up a cornice in the baroque style. In the second half of the 19th century, a large tabernacle was built from the ruined church of Santa Lucia, the statues of St. Francis and St. Anthony were removed from the altar and out of the side doors of the choir brothers. In 1939 the tabernacle, deemed too ostentatious for the Franciscan ideal, was changed. On the pediment of the triumphal arch, the Eternal Father; and on the sides, the Annunciation in painted wood (second half of the sixteenth century): these are attributed to Girolamo Campagna.
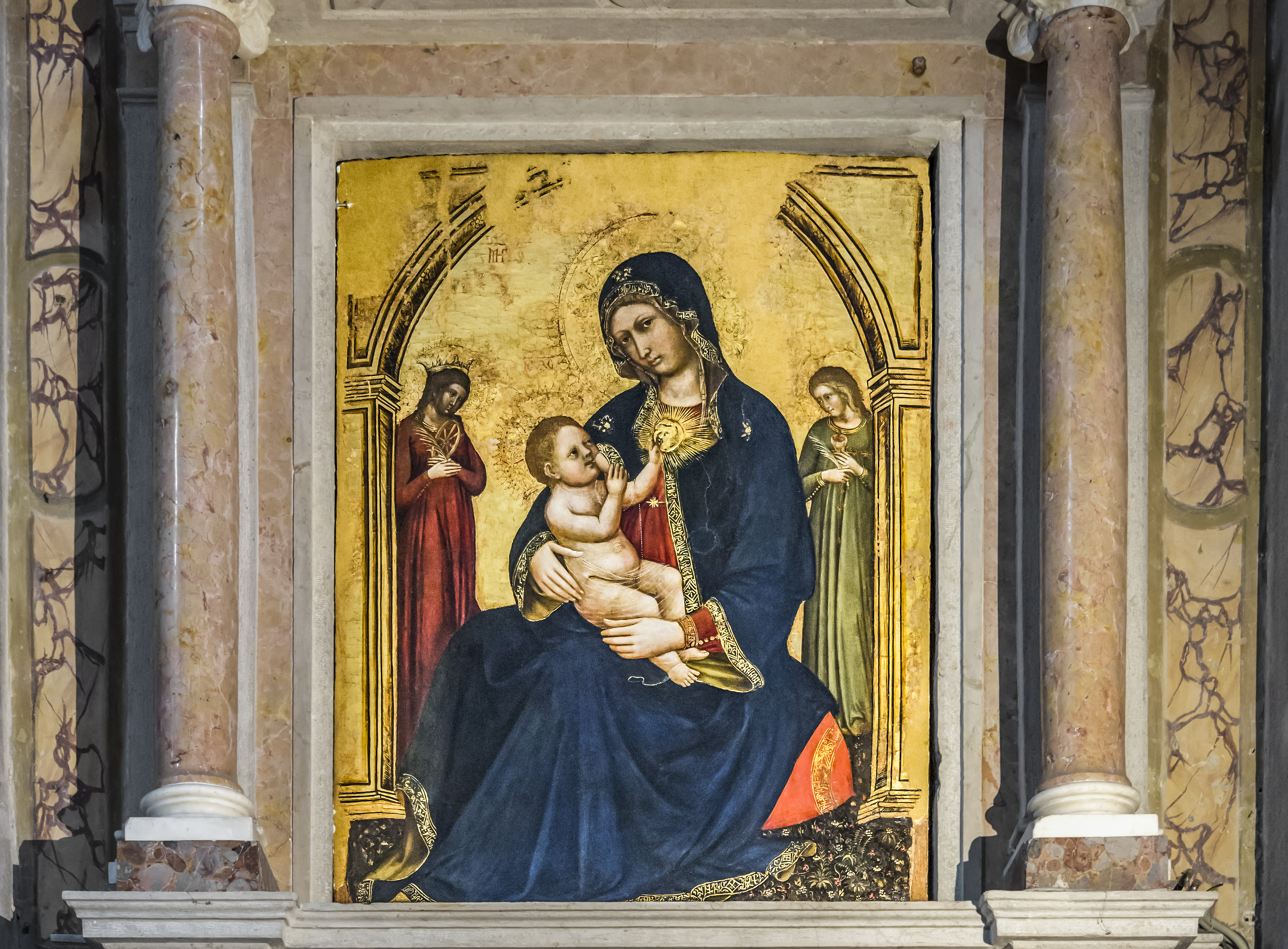
Madonna dell’Umiltà

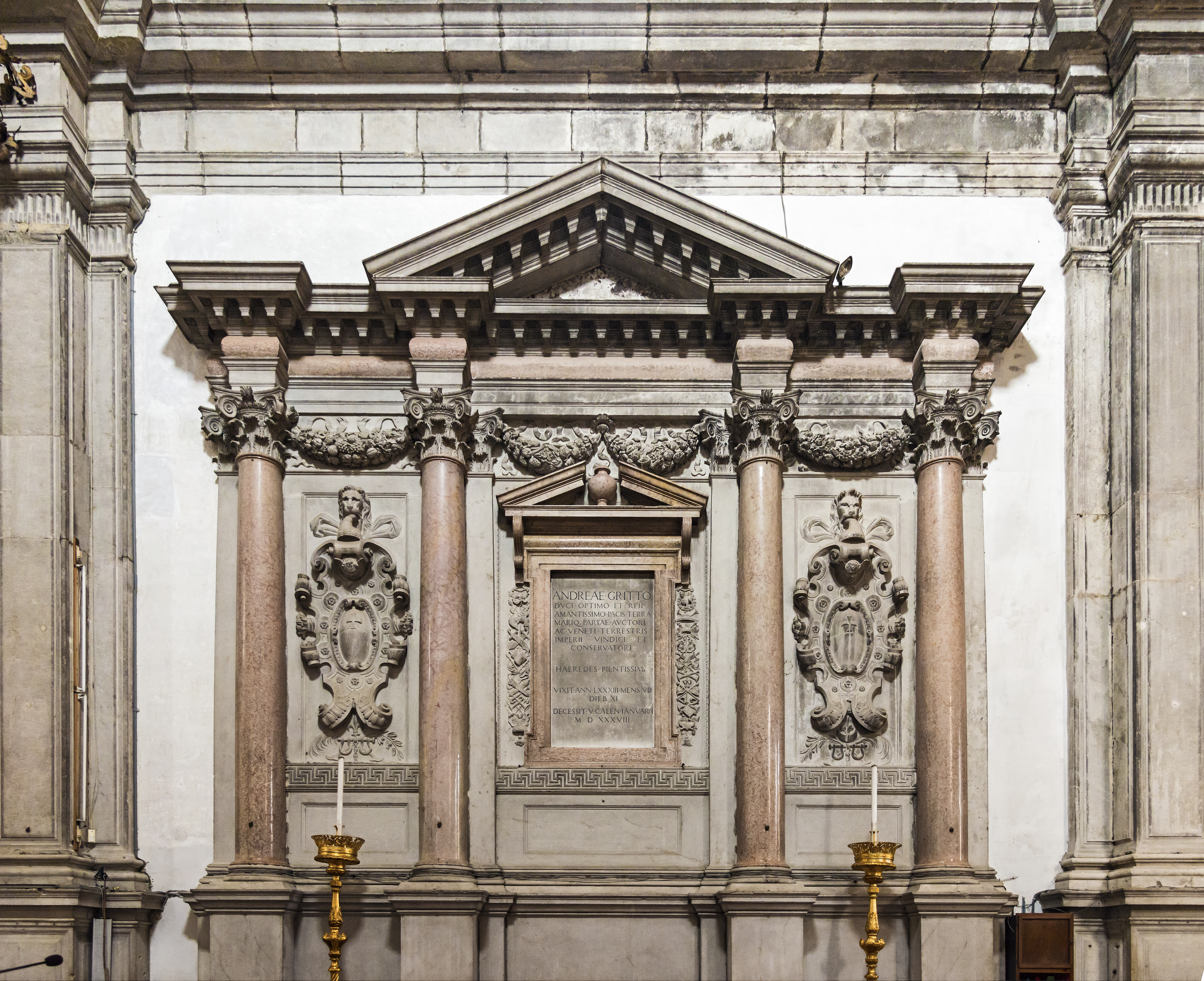
Monument to Andrea Gritti

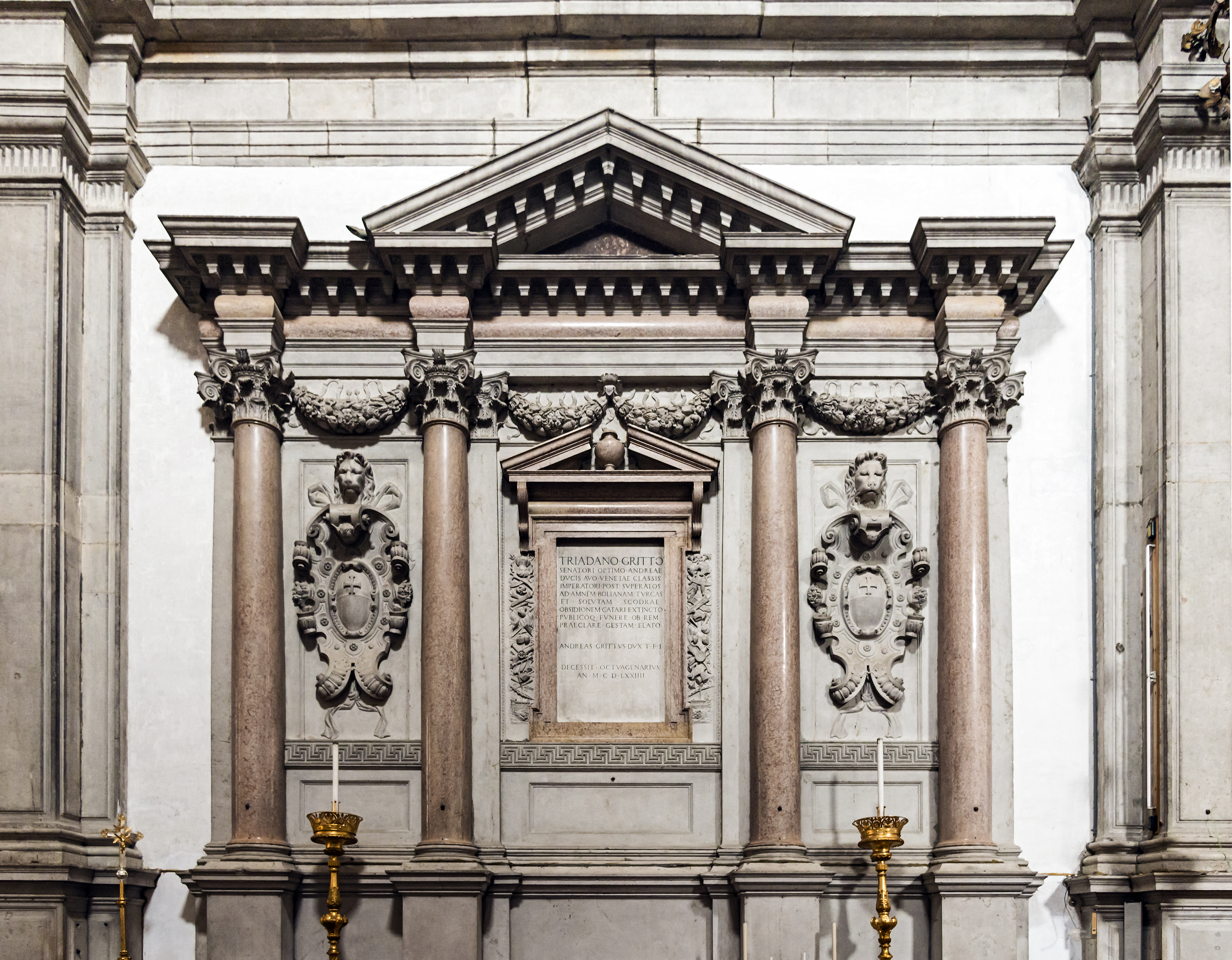
Monument to Tradiano Gritti

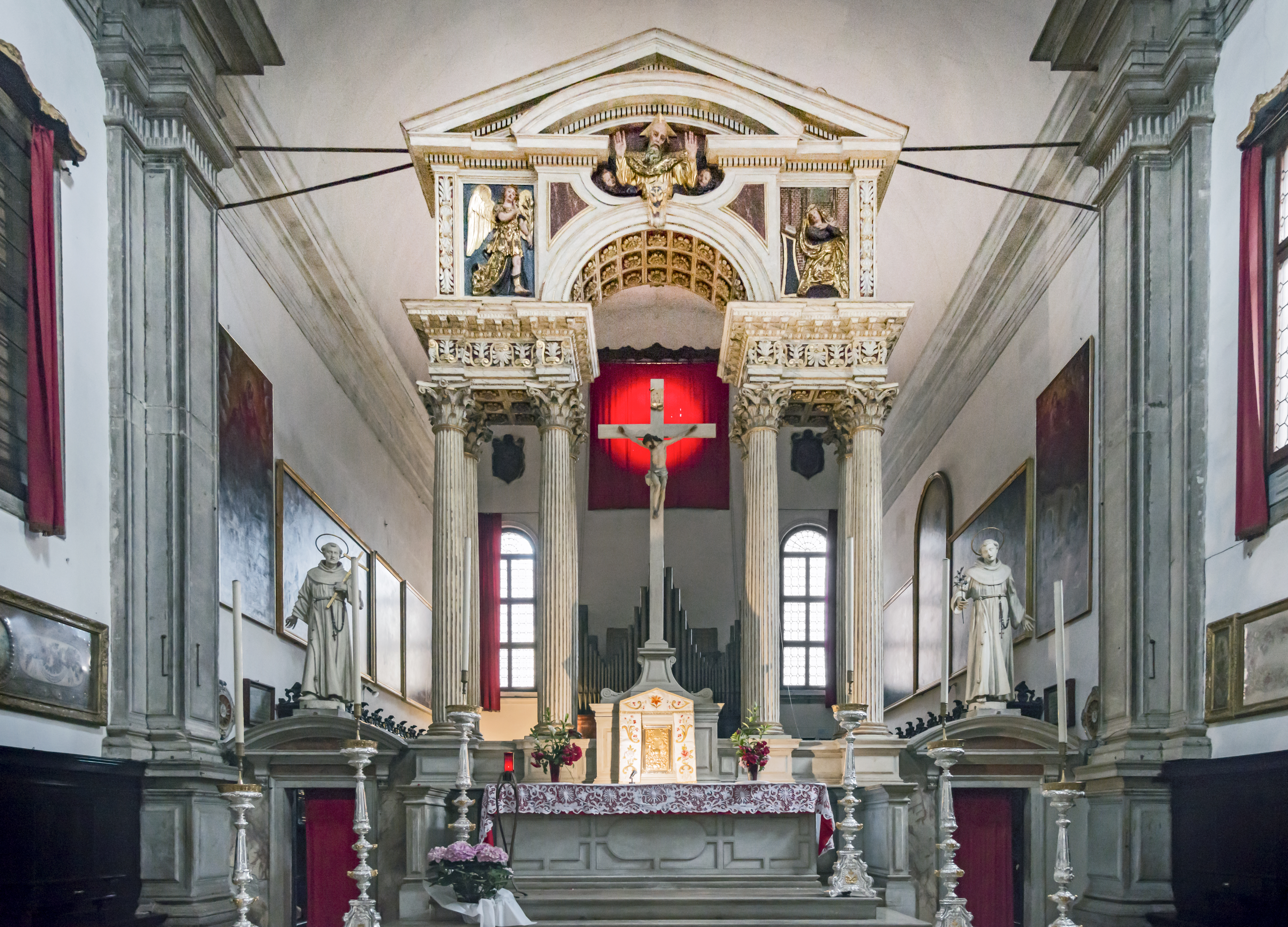
Main altar

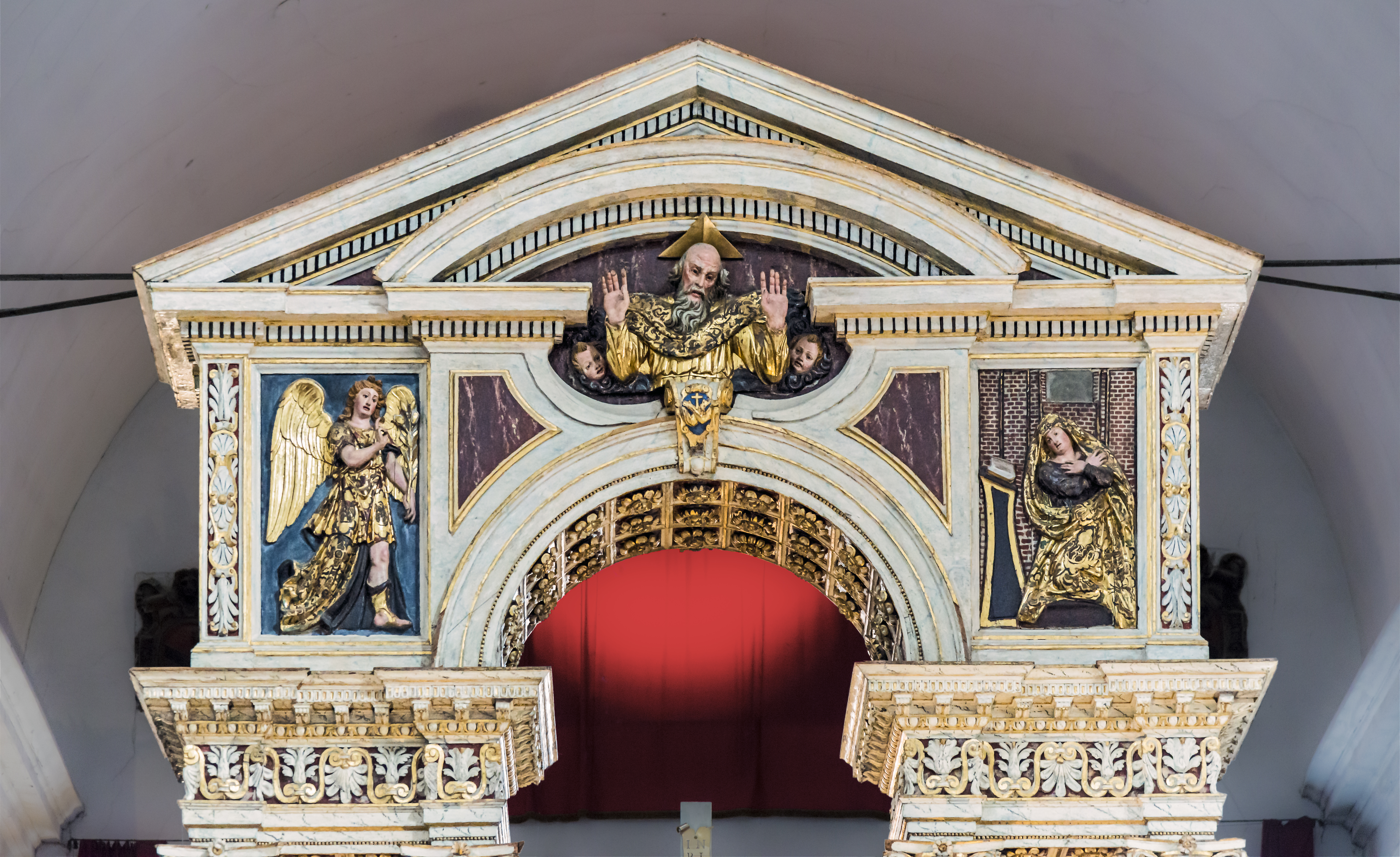
Main altar pediment by Girolamo Campagna

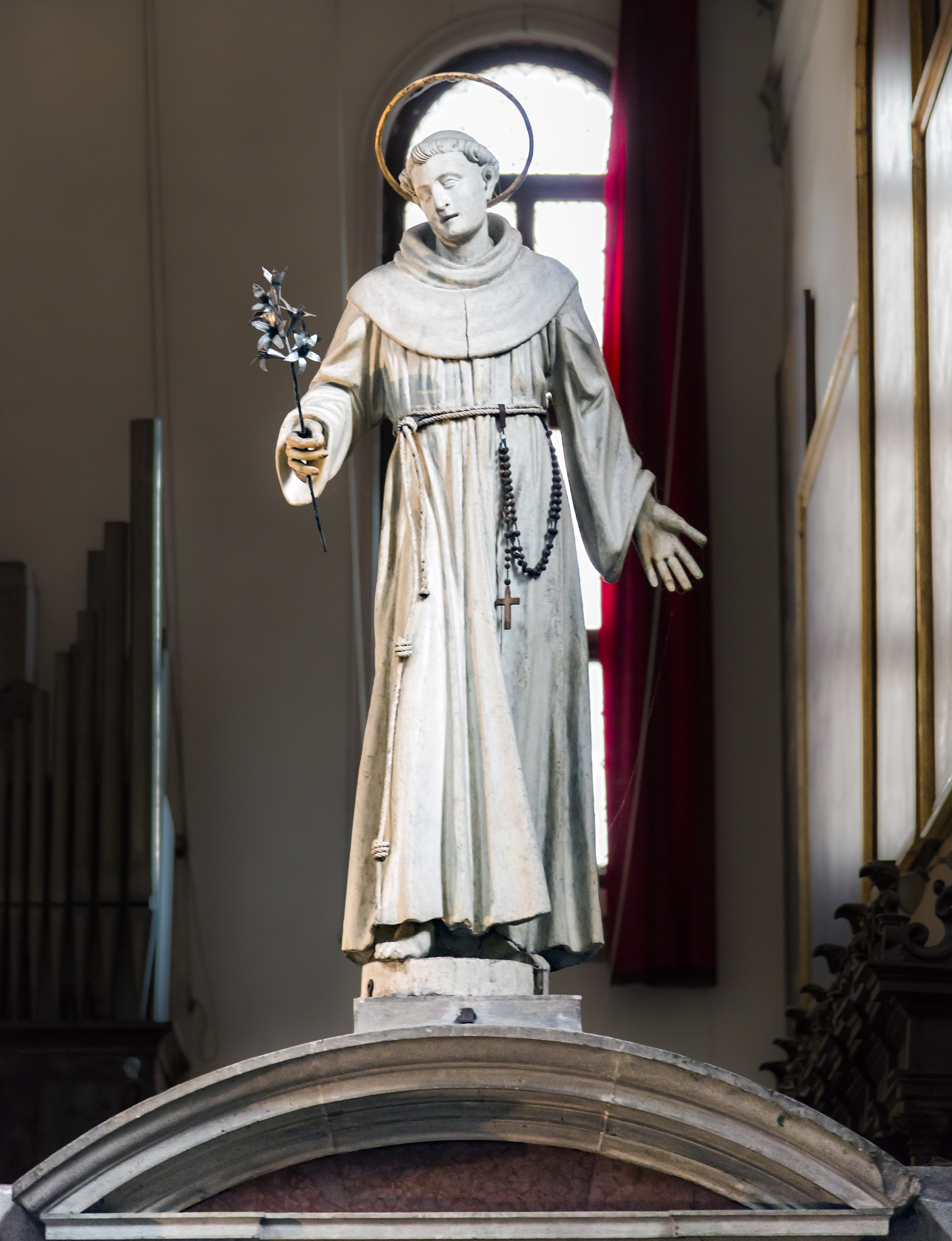
Antony of Padua by Girolamo Campagna

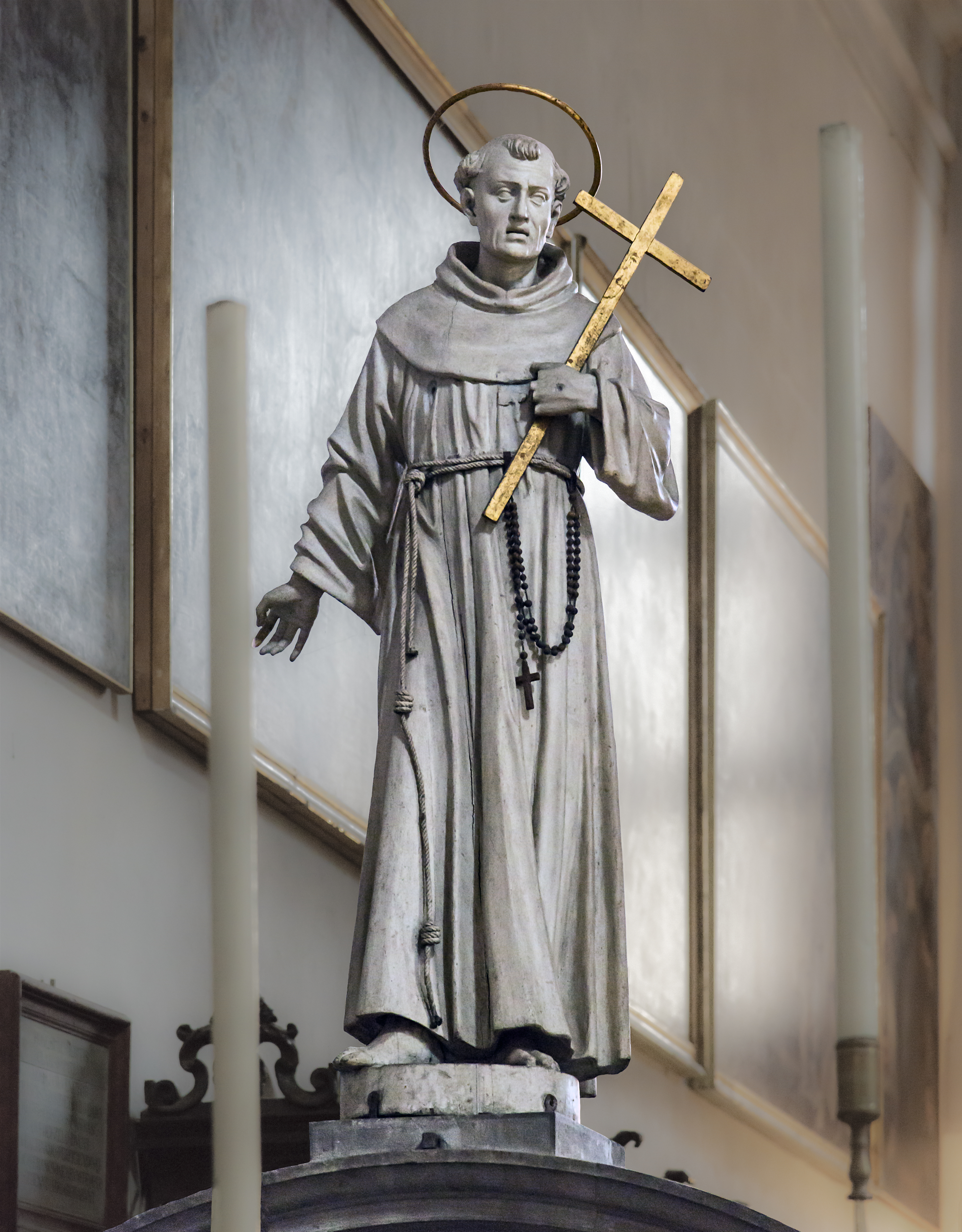
Francis of Assis by Girolamo Campagna

=== Transept right ===
The Chapel Giustinian dei Vescovi

The absidial chapel of right; It is under the patronage of Peter of Alcántara. It was financed and dedicated to the Giustinian "dei vescovi" family (bishops) because this branch of the family had a good number of prelates in these ranks. The vault is decorated with stucco of the eighteenth century, with a central medallion Saint Peter of Alcantara in Glory (1765) by Francesco Fontebasso. On either side of the stalls of the eighteenth century; Above the tables with gypseries. On the right wall: The death of Peter of Alcántara (1765) Francesco Fontebasso, Penance and meditation (1789) by Francesco Maggiotto, Peter of Alcántara and the Queen of Spain, (1765) Francesco Fontebasso. The altar: the table of the altar represents Francis of Assisi receiving the infant Jesus of the Virgin beginning of the seventeenth century by Sante Peranda. On the left wall: The ecstasy of Saint Peter (1765) Francesco Fontebasso, The theological virtues (1785) by Jacopo Marieschi, Peter of Alcántara shows FRancesc ad'Avila the way to paradise (1765) Francesco Fontebasso

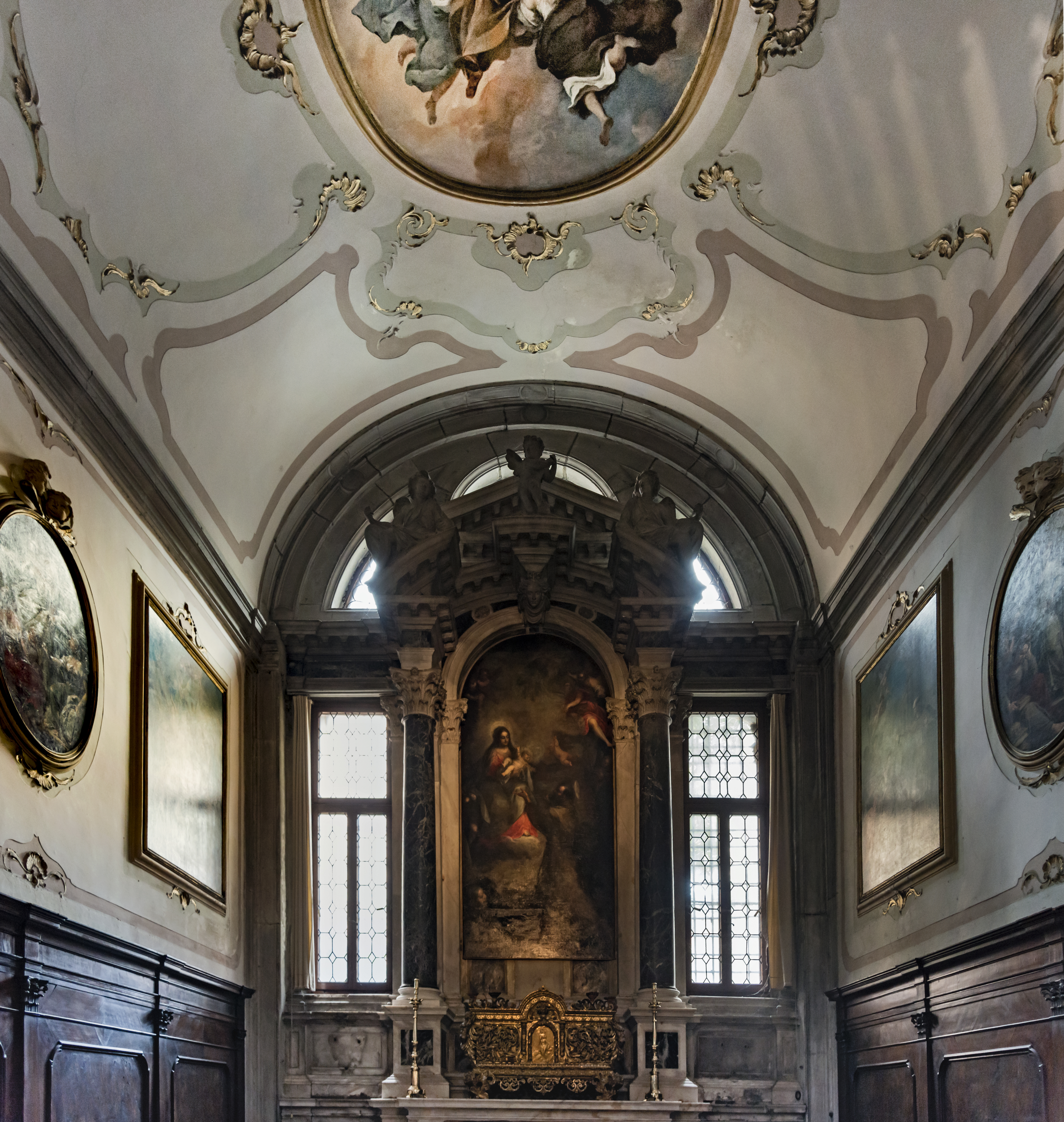
The Chapel Giustinian dei Vescovi

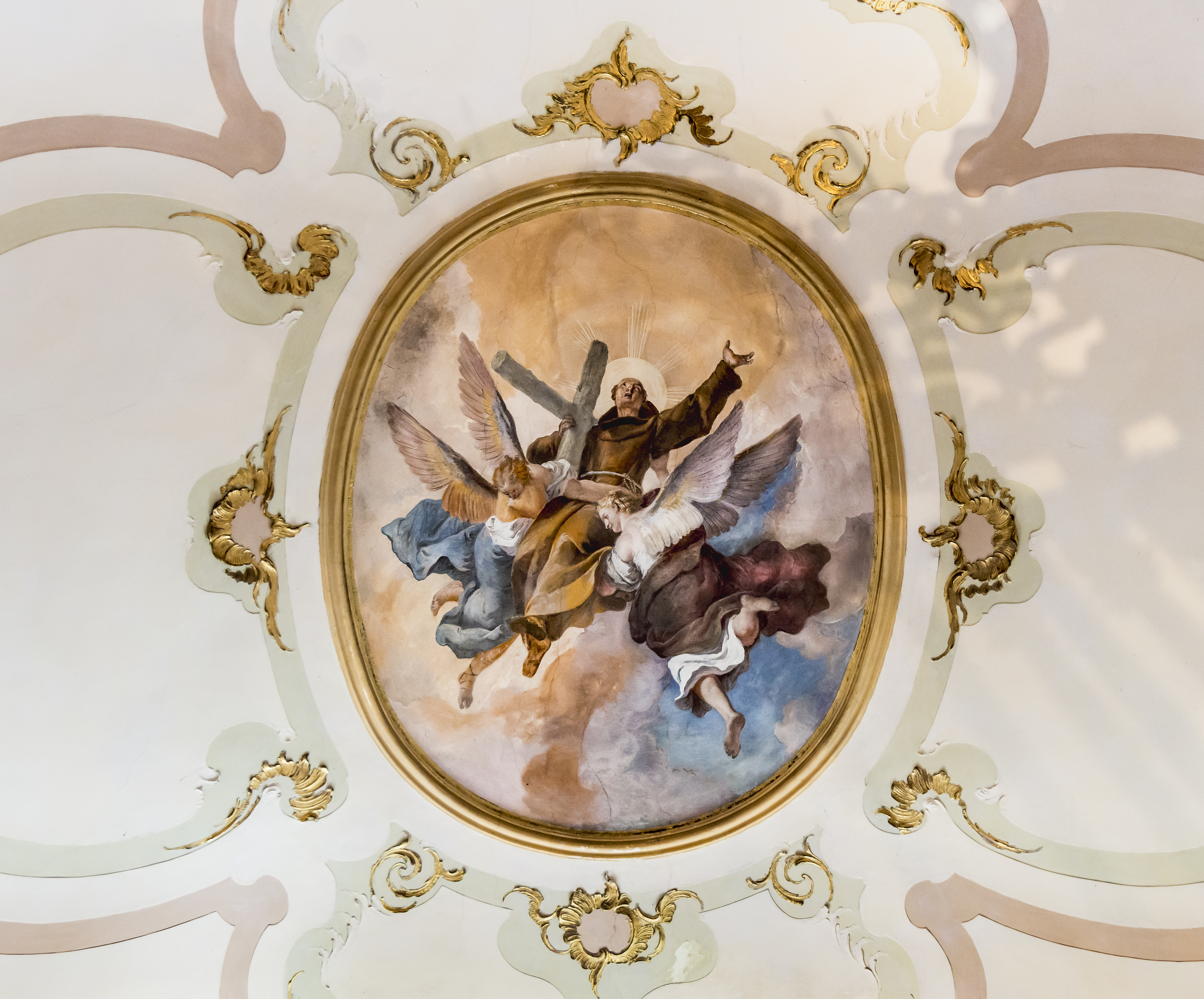
Saint Peter of Alcantara in Glory Francesco Fontebasso

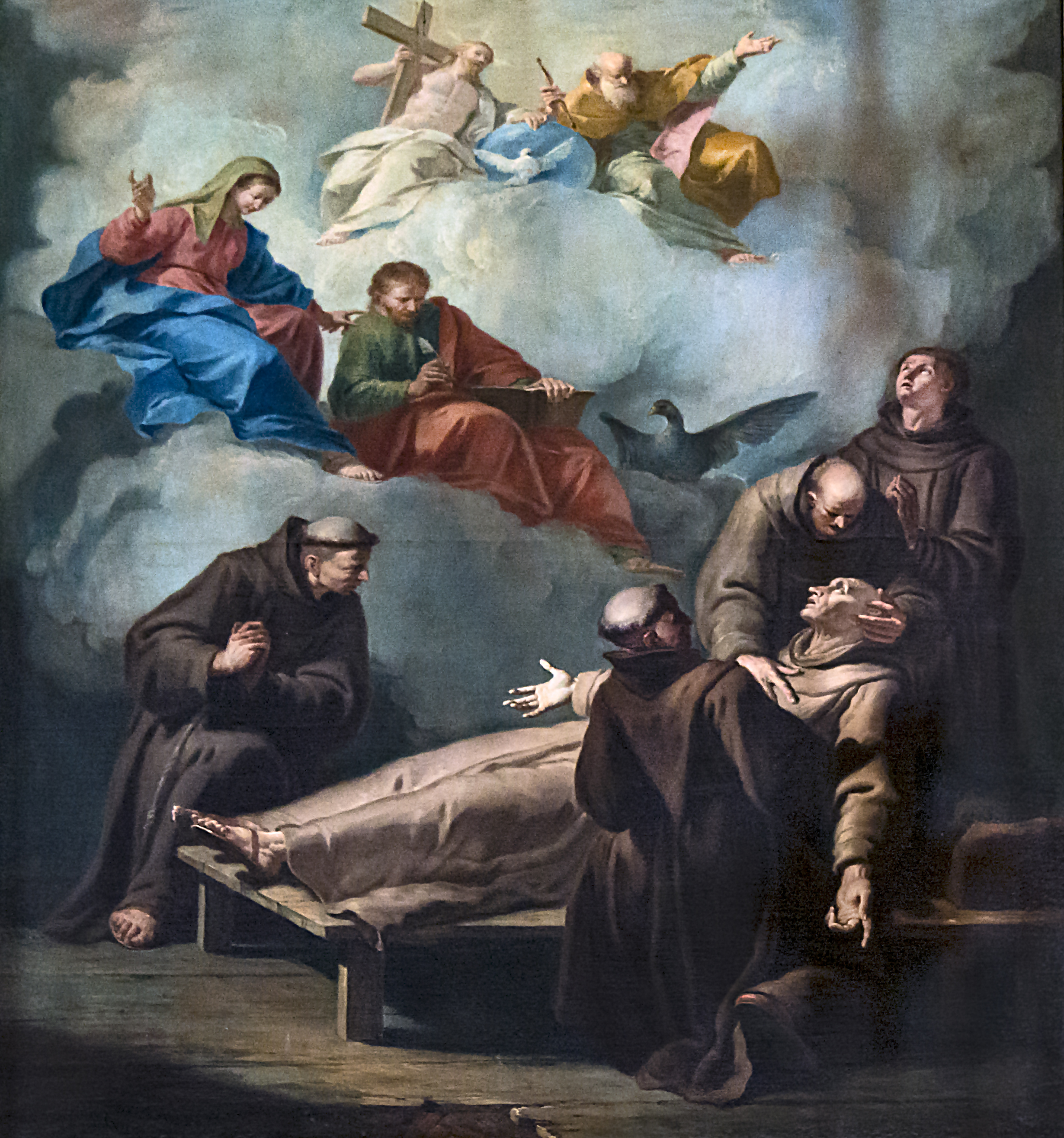
Death of Peter of Alcántara

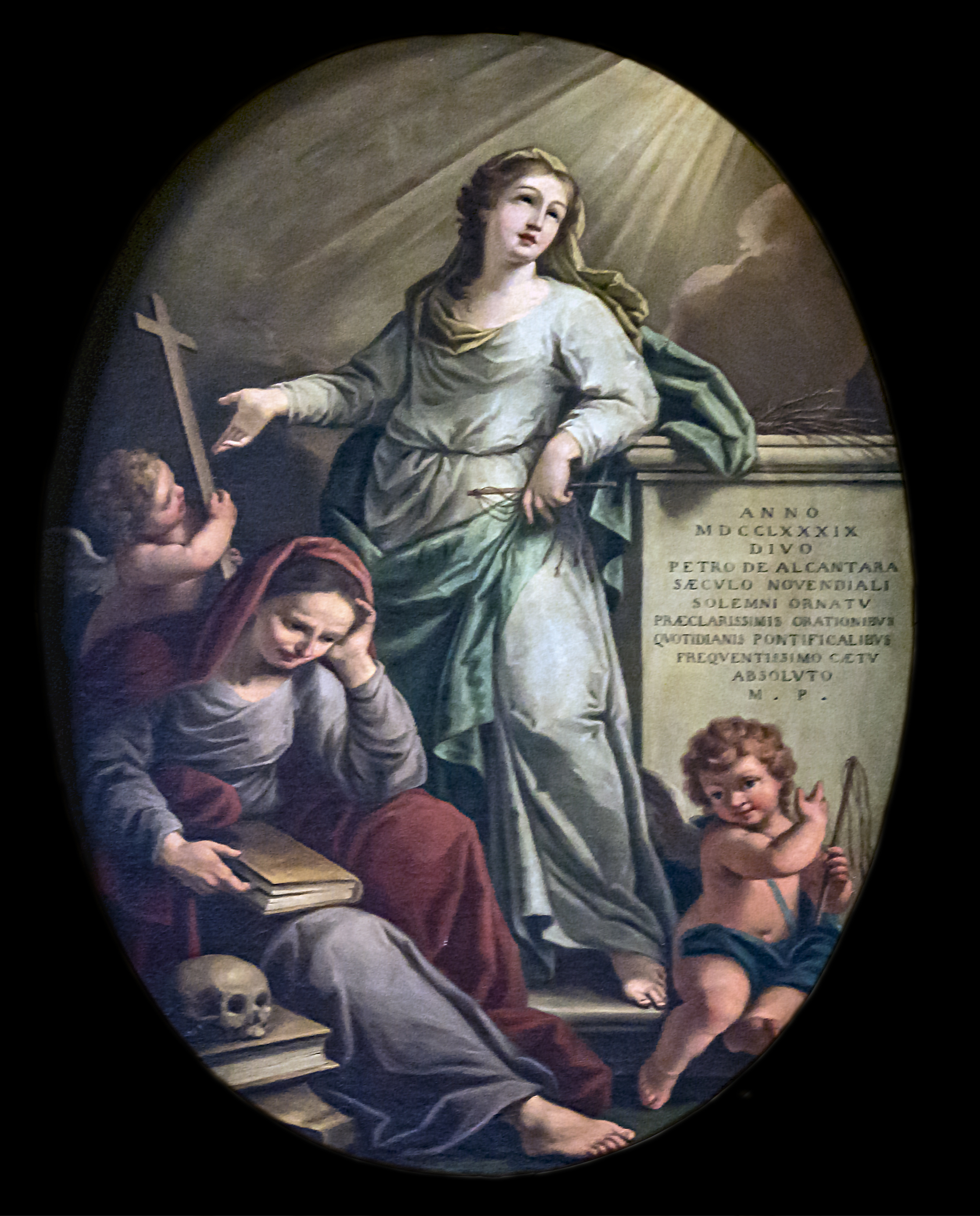
Penance and Meditation by Francesco Maggiotto

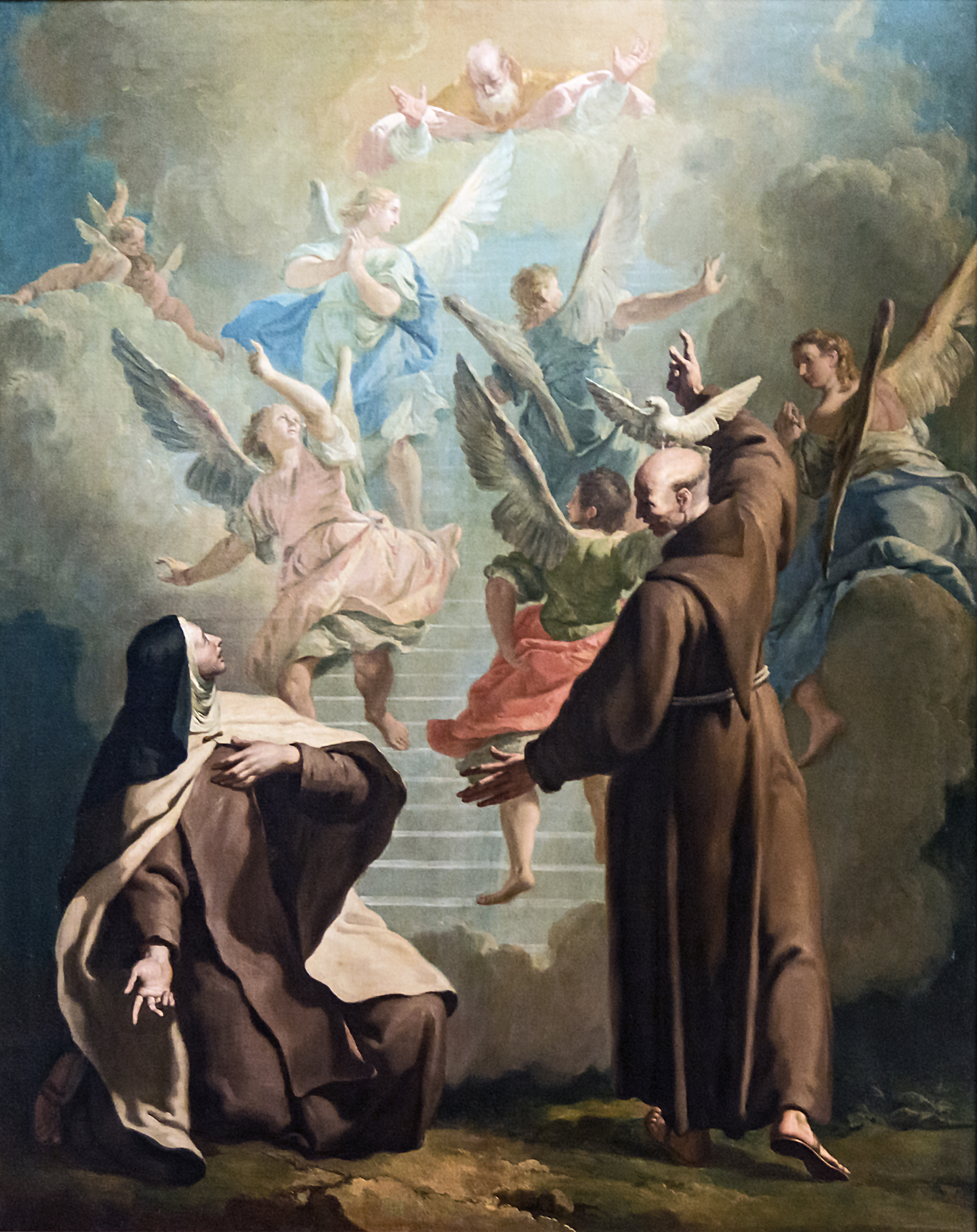
Peter of Alcantara shows, to Teresa d'Avila, the way to paradise

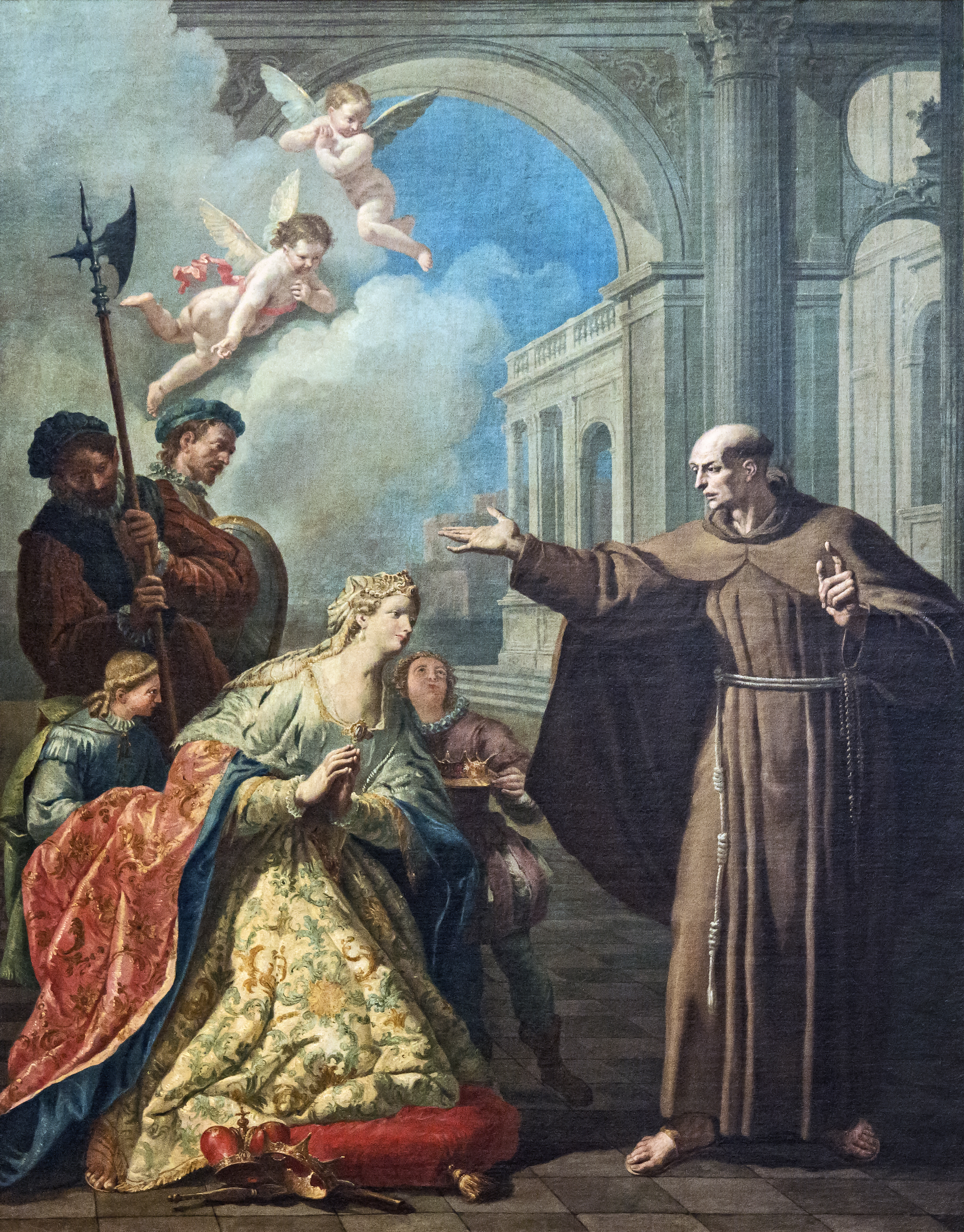
Peter of Alcántara and the Queen of Spain

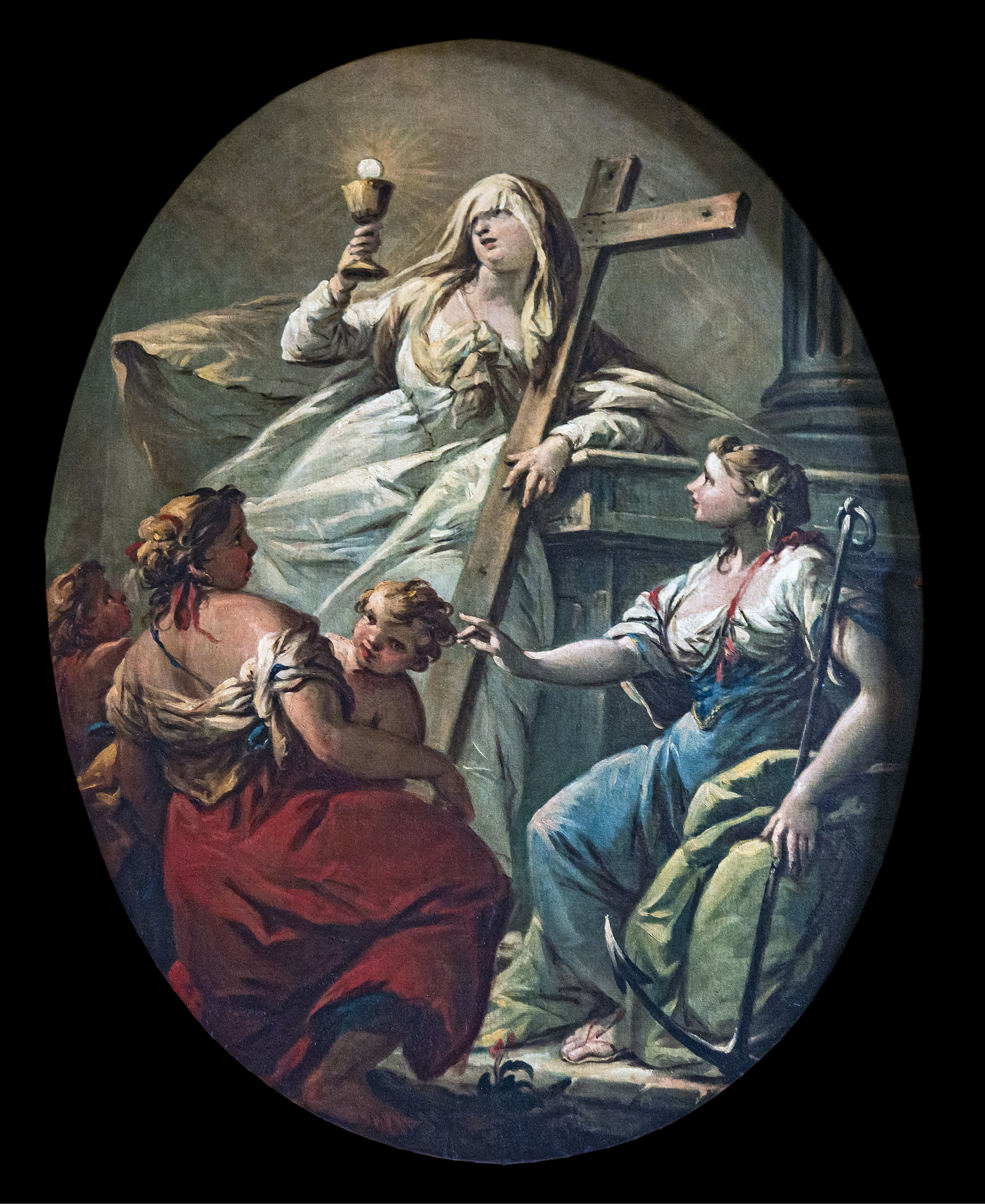
The theological virtues

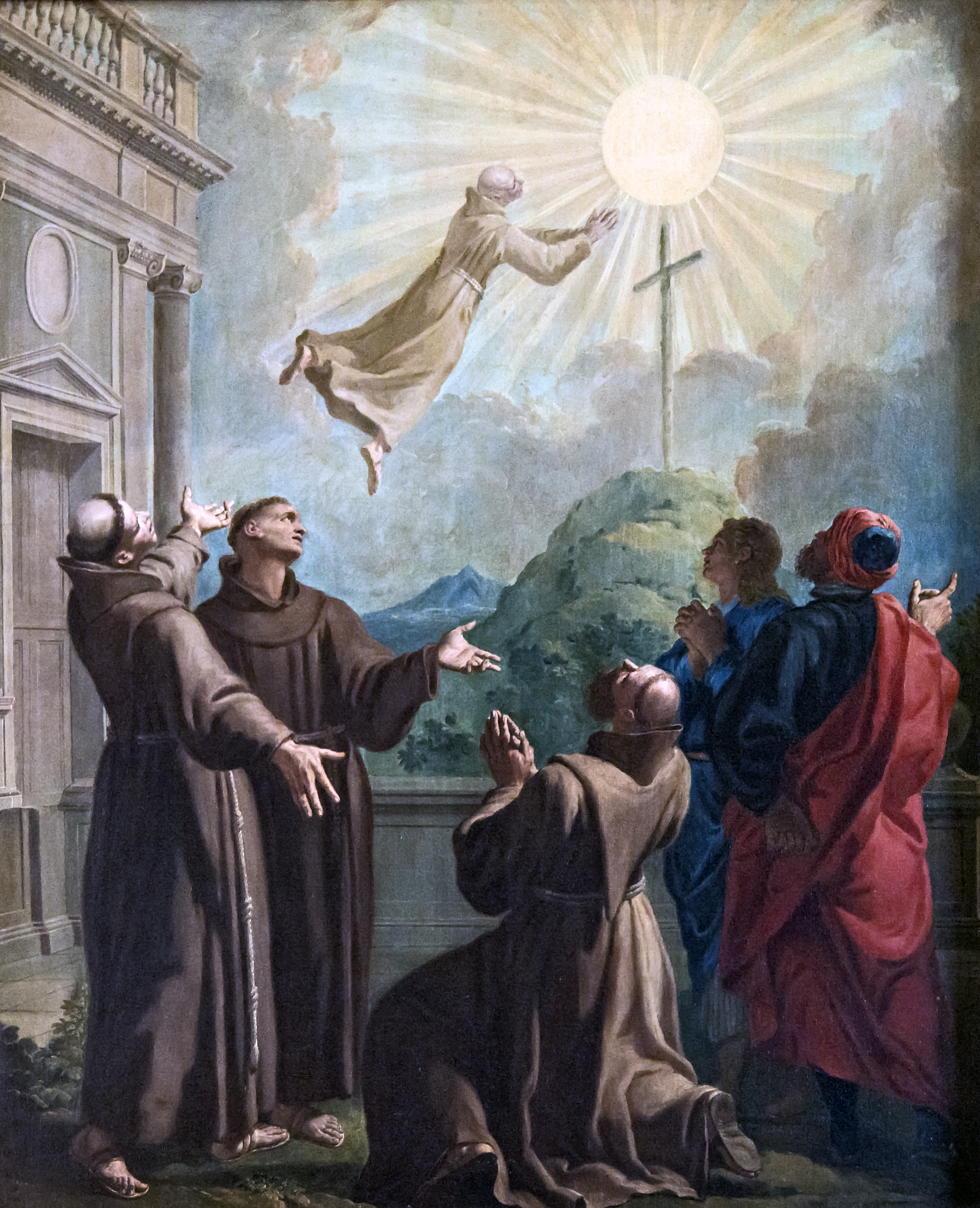
Ecstasy of Saint Peter

Altar for the Morosini di Sbarra family

The Enthroned Madonna and child (c. 1478) by Antonio da Negroponte. A lunette was added to the painting later, depicting God the Father and the Holy Ghost (early 16th century) by Benedetto Rusconi (il Diana).

The transept has a side portal called the Holy Land portal with a Monument to Domenico Trevisan, in right wall portrait of Saint Lawrence of Rome.

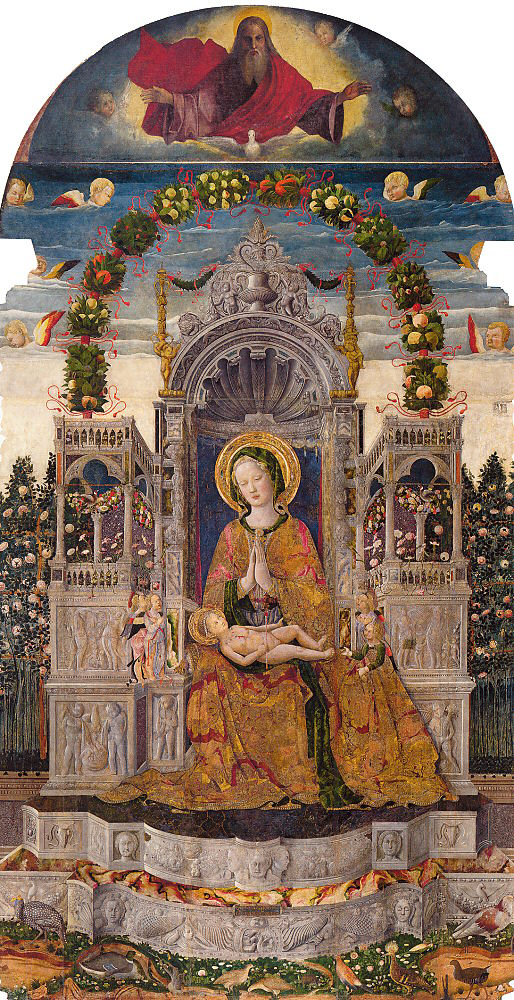
Virgin and Child Enthroned, by Fra Antonio da Negroponte

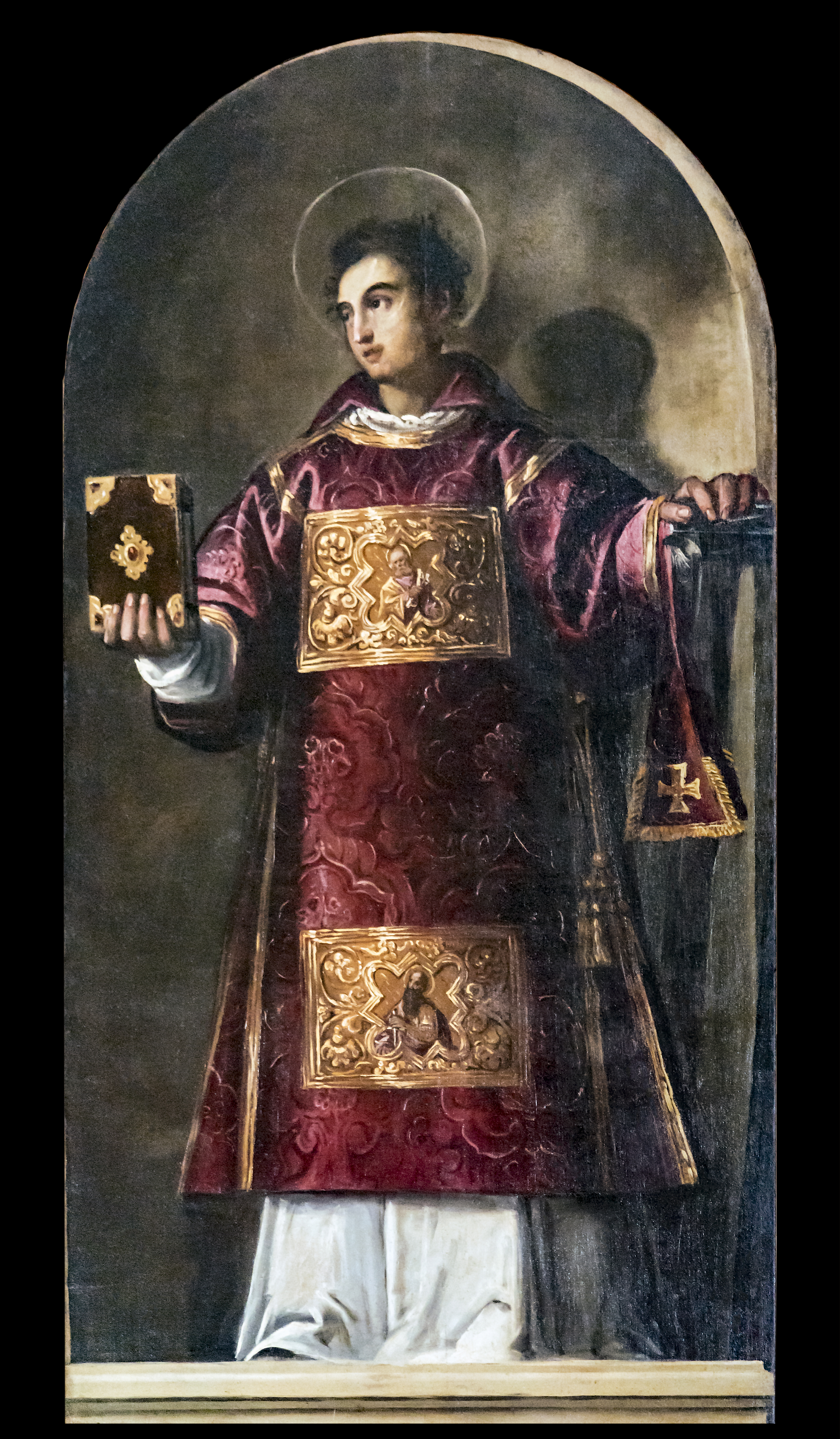
Saint Lawrence of Rome

== Sources ==
- Howard, Deborah (1975). Yale University press (ed.). Jacopo Sansovino; Architecture and Patronage in Renaissance Venice. pp. 64–74.
- SaveVenice entry
- Drawing by Canaletto from 1735-40.
- "The Cappella Sagredo in San Francesco della Vigna", by William L. Barcham. Artibus et Historiae (1983). Volume 4(7): 101-124.
