= Dese =

Dese may refer to:

- Dessie, a city and a woreda in north-central Ethiopia
- Centre For Electronics Design And Technology, Bangalore, India
- DESE Research, a firm based in Huntsville, Alabama
- Missouri Department of Elementary and Secondary Education
- Massachusetts Department of Elementary and Secondary Education

== See also ==
- Piombino Dese, a comune (municipality) in the Province of Padua in the Italian region Veneto
