= Tiziano Aspetti =

Italian sculptor

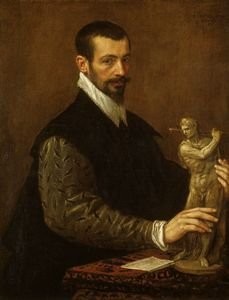
Tiziano Aspetti

Tiziano Aspetti (1559–1606) was an Italian sculptor of the Renaissance. He was born in Padua and active mainly there and in Venice. He completed both large and small sculpture in bronze. Among his large works are bronze statues in the façade of San Francesco della Vigna and of Saint Anthony and many other sculptural decorations for the Basilica of Sant'Antonio of Padua.

When Aspetti began his public career in the 1590s, Alessandro Vittoria had practically stopped sculpting and Girolamo Campagna had a monopoly on the main sculptural commissions. Although Aspetti beat Campagna to the commission for the Sant'Antonio altar, he was not so successful in Venice, producing nothing quite as powerful as Campagna's high altar for San Giorgio Maggiore (1590–1593) and the altar at San Salvatore (c. 1590).

However, he had no rivals in Florence for producing reliefs, other than perhaps Giovanni Battista Caccini and his contemporary Giambologna, which may have been Aspetti's reason for moving there in 1604, completing a bronze relief of the Death of St. Lawrence now in the Florentine church of Santa Trinita in Florence. He flourished in Tuscany and died in Pisa, though it is impossible to fully analyse him as an artist until more is discovered about the now-lost works he produced there, especially eight mythological works.

== Life and works ==
=== Early life ===
His mother's family had produced many other artists - nicknamed 'Lizzaro', her father Guido Minio had specialised in bronze casting and her brother Tiziano Minio was a noted sculptor and stucco-artist. Aspetti was probably trained in the family studio and may have been a studio assistant to Girolamo Campagna, the other major sculptor active in Venice in the late 16th century. His family contacts definitely allowed Aspetti to join the household of Giovanni Grimani in Venice in 1577, ultimately spending sixteen years in it.

Patriarch of Aquileia from a family which had produced three doges, Grimani was also a major patron of contemporary artists and his palazzo hosted one of Italy's large and valuable collection of antiquities outside of Rome, a major draw for visitors to Venice. Aspetti's long service was unlike the repeated commission-hunting of other artists in Venice at the time, making him almost a court artist and . The Patriarch's family supported Italian Mannerist art and their palazzo near Santa Maria Formosa contained stucco work by Giovanni da Udine, Federico Zuccari and Francesco Salviati. Spending his youth in the rich and elegant surroundings of the collection, including time restoring some of the antiquities, made its mark and can be seen in his mature works.

His first known works are two mediocre bas-reliefs of Saint Mark and Saint Theodore in 'pietra viva' for the 'new' Rialto Bridge and the clumsy Giant in marble sited in what is now the entrance to the Libreria Marciana, neither of them relating to the elegance of his later works. The Atlantes supporting a bas-relief (c. 1589) over the fireplace in the Sala dell'Anticollegio of the Palazzo Ducale by Campagna were for a time misattributed to Aspetti, who actually produced the bas-relief itself of Vulcan's forge. His first surviving bronzes are the life-size allegorical figures of Temperance and Justicec in the Grimani chapel in San Francesco della Vigna. They were undertaken before 28 November 1592, the date at which the Patriarch used a codicil in his will to order the artist to complete them. He also ordered Aspetti to execute the figures of Moses and Saint Paul for the same church, as will be discussed later. Aspetti was painted by Leandro Bassano around 1592, a work now held in the Royal Collection of the United Kingdom.

=== Padua ===
Thanks to the Grimani's patronage, Aspetti's fame quickly spread to Padua and early in the 1590s he produced bronze bas-reliefs of Saint Daniel Dragged Along By A Horse and The Martyrdom of Saint Daniel for its cathedral, probably for an altar to that saint in the crypt. What is probably the original casting is now in the Metropolitan Museum of Art, later replaced by another casting, the latter still being in Padua's Diocesan Museum of Religious Art and probably produced in the 19th century.

Aspetti's approach was profoundly pictorial and showed his true vocation for bas-relief sculpture. He and his uncle were among the few Venetian sculptors interested in Florentine techniques for producing bas-reliefs (starting with the Donatellian stiacciato, which had such, in Padua) and his figures ranged from low reliefs to almost fully in-the-round sculpture. In fact, he so far exceeded his commissioner's expectations that his pay was doubled. In the two scenes he produced spatial richness through a variety of emotions, poses and textures varying between brick and stone architectural backgrounds, bare flesh, leather and armour. The emotional range in Martyrdom extends from the executioner nailing the saint's naked and pitiable body to the indifferent soldiers on the right and the consternation of the men on the left. The work even evokes sound, with a barking dog and a horse neighing and rearing near a man playing a hunting horn, as in Dragged. The elongated, slender and dynamic figures fit the canon of physical beauty and reflect the artist's knowledge of contemporary Mannerism as well as Hellenistic art. The widespread use of the burin, intaglio, fire marks and other techniques reproduces a pattern on the whole surface and attest to his love for pictorial and coloristic effects. They and the Annunciation (Art Institute of Chicago; early 1580) are the first worthy successors to Jacopo Sansovino's bronze reliefs for St Mark's Basilica in Venice.

After the two works' notable success, on 6 November 1593 Aspetti received a very lucrative and prestigious commission for a new marble altarpiece for the Sant'Antonio chapel in the Basilica of Saint Anthony of Padua, to be adorned with bronze statues of three Franciscan saints (Anthony of Padua, Saint Bonaventure and Louis of Toulouse), the four cardinal virtues of Faith, Charity, Temperance and Fortitude or Hope and four candle-bearing angels (the Virtues were placed in the choir in 1597 on the balustrade of the high altar). This was the third and biggest monumental complex dedicated to St Anthony after Donatello's high altarpiece (completed in 1453) and the bronze statues and marble reliefs decorating the side walls of the Sant'Antonio chapel. The statues of three Franciscan saints were not typical of Aspetti, instead emulating Donatello. The Virtues were depicted half life-size, with small heads, elongated bodies and elegant drapery, more typical of Aspetti's style at this time.

=== Later work in the Veneto ===
Aspetti completed the altarpiece around 30 December 1595, at which date he was commissioned to produce a figure of Christ for the font by Giovanni Antonio Minelli de' Bardi in the north-west nave aisle, completed on 8 May 1599. The bronze busts of Sebastiano Venier, Agostino Barbarigo (victors of the 1571 Battle of Lepanto) and Marcantonio Bragadin (defender of Famagosta and killed in the same year as Lepanto), all in the Ducal Palace of Venice, all seem to have been modelled and cast in 1596–1599. The same date is assigned to the figures of St Paul and Moses for Palladian niches on the facade of San Francesco della Vigna, where they remain. Few of Venice's church facades have been completed and still fewer have facade sculptures, especially before 1600, with the Moses and St Paul among the first bronze statues on the facade of a Venetian church, their dark material contrasting with the white marble background. Once these projects were complete Aspetti made his first known trip beyond the Veneto. He was recorded as being in Carrara in October 1599, but he returned to Venice in or by 1602.

=== Tuscany (1604 onwards) ===
Aspetti left Venice permanently sometime after 3 July 1604 to accompany Giovanni Grimani's nephew Antonio Grimani, bishop of Torcello, to Pisa, after the latter was made apostolic nuncio for Tuscany, proof of Aspetti's strong links with the Grimani family. These final years of Aspetti's life in count Camillo Berzighelli's household in Pisa were highly productive, during which he produced two bronze crucifixes, a bronze relief showing Berzighelli's second wife Luisa Paganelli, eight bronze reliefs of mythological scenes, a silver piece showing Christ at the column with two whippers (left in Aspetti's will to the basilica of St Anthony back in Padua), a marble Hercules and Antaeus, a marble Adonis and a Sleeping Leda, none of which works have however survived.

The only surviving sculpture from Aspetti's years in Pisa is The Martyrdom of Saint Laurence, a bronze relief commissioned by Berzighelli's uncle senator Lorenzo Usimbardi (1547–1636). Although throughout its history it has formed the front of the altar in the Usimbardi chapel at the north-west corner of the nave of Santa Trinita, Florence, a 17th-century source states Usimbardi had commissioned it "for another place" (probably the San Pietro chapel). There may be some truth to this, in that the work is the only decorative element in the chapel which does not relate to Saint Peter and his cult. However, it is safe to assume that Aspetti would have finished the rest of the chapel's sculptures had he lived long enough, since they were produced after his death by his pupil Felice Palma - a bronze crucifix by Palma over the altar may draw on a design by Aspetti.

Martyrdom showed a deeper feeling than the two reliefs made for the basilica in Padua, being less theatrical and more pictorial. It is well-attuned to contemporary Counter Reformation poetry, particularly in Laurence's stubborn and immovable depiction in the centre of the work, looking diagonally up to heaven even as he is being placed on the gridiron, the instrument of his martyrdom. The figures and types are much more robust and muscular than in Aspetti's younger works, as is particularly seen in the superbly-modelled figure curled up in front of the main sculptural group, showing the mastery he had gained in depicting the nude. The work was in 1605 well-integrated into a new decorative scheme for the Usimbardi chapel by Ludovico Cigoli.

Aspetti added a codicil to his will on 27 July 1606 (or 1607 according to the Pisan calendar, which began on 25 March in the modern calendar). At his own request he was buried in the cloisters of Santa Maria del Carmine in Pisa, with Berzighelli paying for the funeral - a 1606 bust of Aspetti by Palma and an inscription both still survive on the site. Unmarried and without issue, he made a nephew his heir.
