= CEDT =

CEDT may refer to:

- Central European Summer Time
- Centre For Electronics Design And Technology, a department of the Indian Institute of Science
- Certificate of Exemption to the Dictation Test, an historical exemption to the Australian White Australia policy
- Crimson Editor, a text editor with internal name cedt.exe
