= Piombino (disambiguation) =

Piombino may refer to the following places in Italy:

- Piombino, in the province of Livorno
- Piombino Dese, in the province of Padova
- Principality of Piombino, an independent state in Italy in 1399-1805
