= Andrea di Alessandro =

Italian sculptor

Andrea di Alessandro (flourished 1530—1569) also known as Andrea di Alessandro Bresciano and identified with Andrea Baruzzi was an Italian sculptor of the Renaissance period. He was born in Brescia and was active there and in Venice during the latter half of the 16th century. He was a pupil of Alessandro Vittoria, and his masterpiece is the bronze candelabra for the church of Santa Maria della Salute in Venice, Italy.

== See also ==
- Ticozzi, Stefano (1830). Dizionario degli architetti, scultori, pittori, intagliatori in rame ed in pietra, coniatori di medaglie, musaicisti, niellatori, intarsiatori d'ogni etá e d'ogni nazione' (Volume 1). Milan: Gaetano Schiepatti. p. 52.
- Getty ULAN entry.
