= Villa Cornaro =

Coordinates: 45°36′14″N 11°59′57″E

UNESCO World Heritage Site
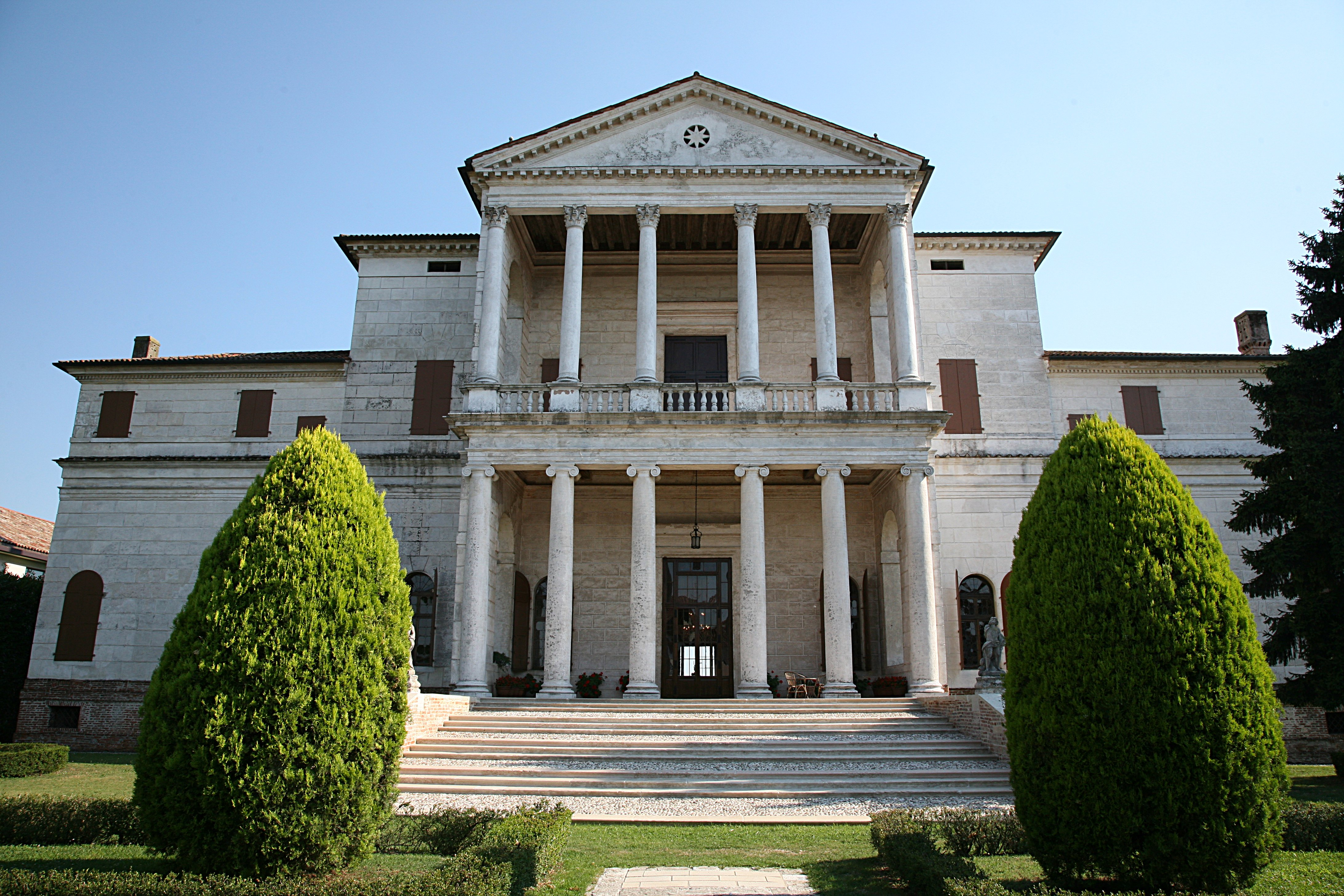
- Villa Cornaro

- Location within Veneto Location within Italy
- Location: Piombino Dese, Province of Venice, Veneto, Italy
- Part of: City of Vicenza and the Palladian Villas of the Veneto
- Criteria: Cultural: (i), (ii)
- Reference: 712bis-023
- Inscription: 1994 (18th Session)
- Extensions: 1996

Villa Cornaro is a patrician villa in Piombino Dese, about 30 km northwest of Venice, Italy. It was designed by the Italian Renaissance architect Andrea Palladio in 1552 and is illustrated and described by him in Book Two of his 1570 masterwork, I quattro libri dell'architettura (The Four Books on Architecture). Villa Cornaro is an example of one of Palladio's designs whose influence can be seen in later architecture. In efforts on preservation, Villa Cornaro has not always remained in the possession of the state.

== Architecture ==
The designing of the Villa Cornaro's main body took place between 1551 and 1552, with it being usable as of 1554. The side wings of the villa would not be brought to completion until 1596 by Vincenzo Scamozzi. In this time period Palladio began to alter his use of orders, architectural styles, within buildings.The Villa Cornaro marks one of Palladio's first uses of the pedimented portico. The villa was designed in a period of time when Palladio's method of designing was changing. The north façade has a projecting central portico-loggia that is a flexible living space out of the sun and open to cooling breezes. The interior space of the villa showcases a symmetrical arrangement, a main principle of Palladio's architecture. Rooms of inter-related proportions composed of squares and rectangles flank a central axial vista, which extends through the house. As Rudolf Wittkower noted, by moving subsidiary staircases into the projecting wings and filling matching corner spaces with paired oval principal stairs, space was left for a central salone, which is fully as wide as the porticos. The central core of the villa forms a rectangle in which there are six repetitions of a standard module. As of the year 1717, Mattia Bortoloni was commissioned for the creation of over one hundred frescos to decorate the Villa Interior. The frescos that occupy the first floor depict various scenes from the Old Testament; the second floor frescos display scenes of the New Testament. Other artistic endeavors that occupy the villa include six sculptural portraits portraying important figures to the family. Some of the depictions include Catherine Cornaro (the Queen of Cyprus), Doge Marco Cornaro (the builder of the villa), and Admiral Giorgio Cornaro. These additions to the Villa Cornaro were completed by sculptor Camillo Mariani.

== Influence ==
Through its illustration in Palladio's I quattro libri dell'architettura, in the 18th century Villa Cornaro became a model for villas all over the world. One such example is Marble Hill House (1724–29) in Twickenham, London. Additionally the influence of Andrea Palladio can be seen in the use of two story porticos in American architecture. Drayton Hall in Charleston, South Carolina is one example of an American structure that boasts this specific feature from Palladio's architecture.

== Conservation ==
Richard Rush purchased the Villa Cornaro in 1969 from the Council of the Villas of the Veneto (L'Ente per le Ville Venete), an organization within Italian Government dedicated to preserving the national monuments of Italy in the Veneto. Rush and his wife, Julia, restored the villa and furnished it with antiques over a period of twenty years under the supervision of the Superintendent of Monuments. Existing since the 1550's, the Villa required some restoration, including but not limited to pillars damaged by American Planes During World War II. Other items, such as blown out windows, also required repairs. Since 1996 the villa has been conserved as part of a World Heritage Site "City of Vicenza and the Palladian Villas of the Veneto".

The villa is owned by Carl and Sally Gable, of Atlanta, Georgia, who purchased it in 1989 for $2 million from Dr. Rush. In 2017, the couple put up the villa for sale; the asking price was 35 million British pounds.

== Gallery ==
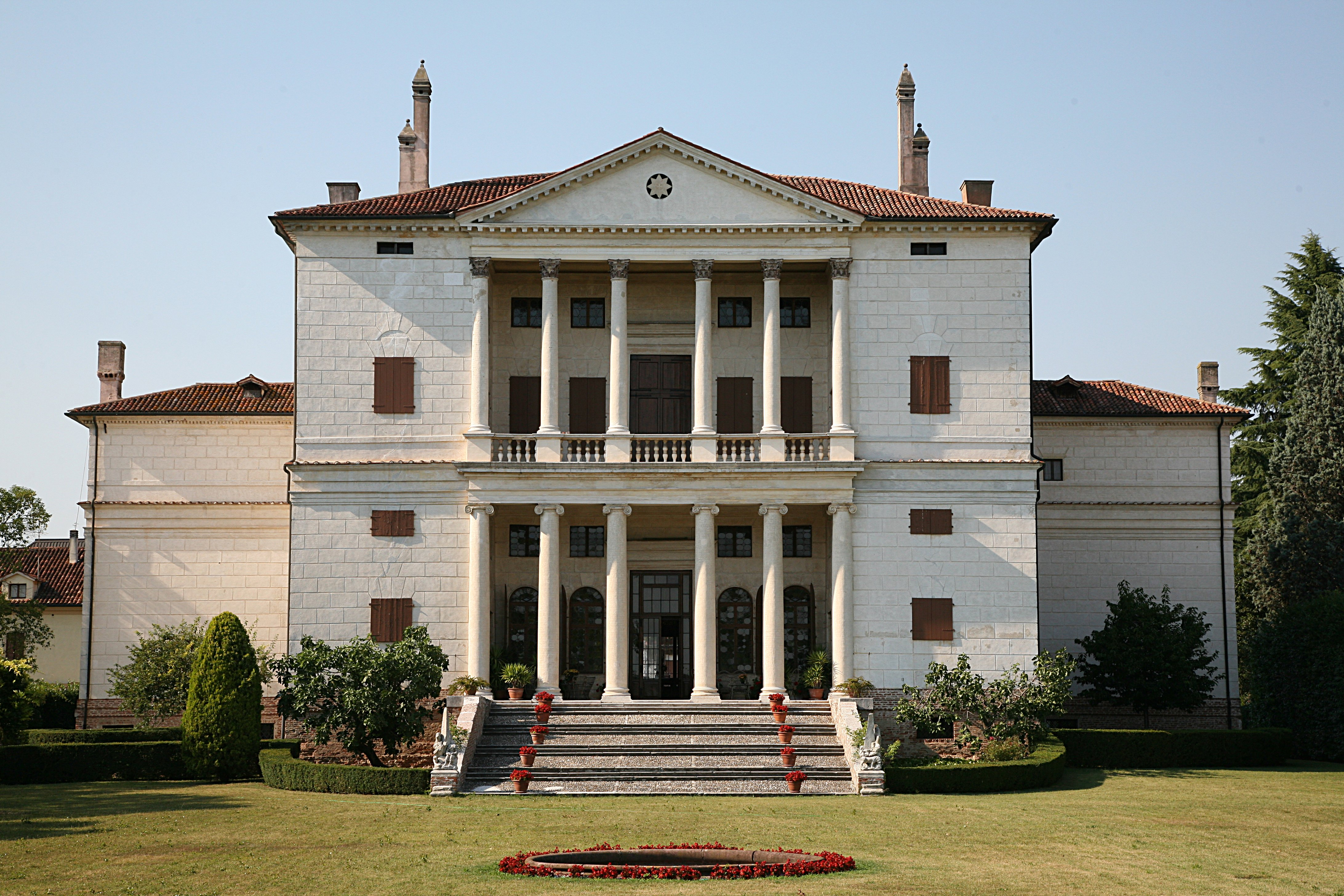
Villa Cornaro at Piombino Dese by Andrea Palladio (taken by Hans A. Rosbach)

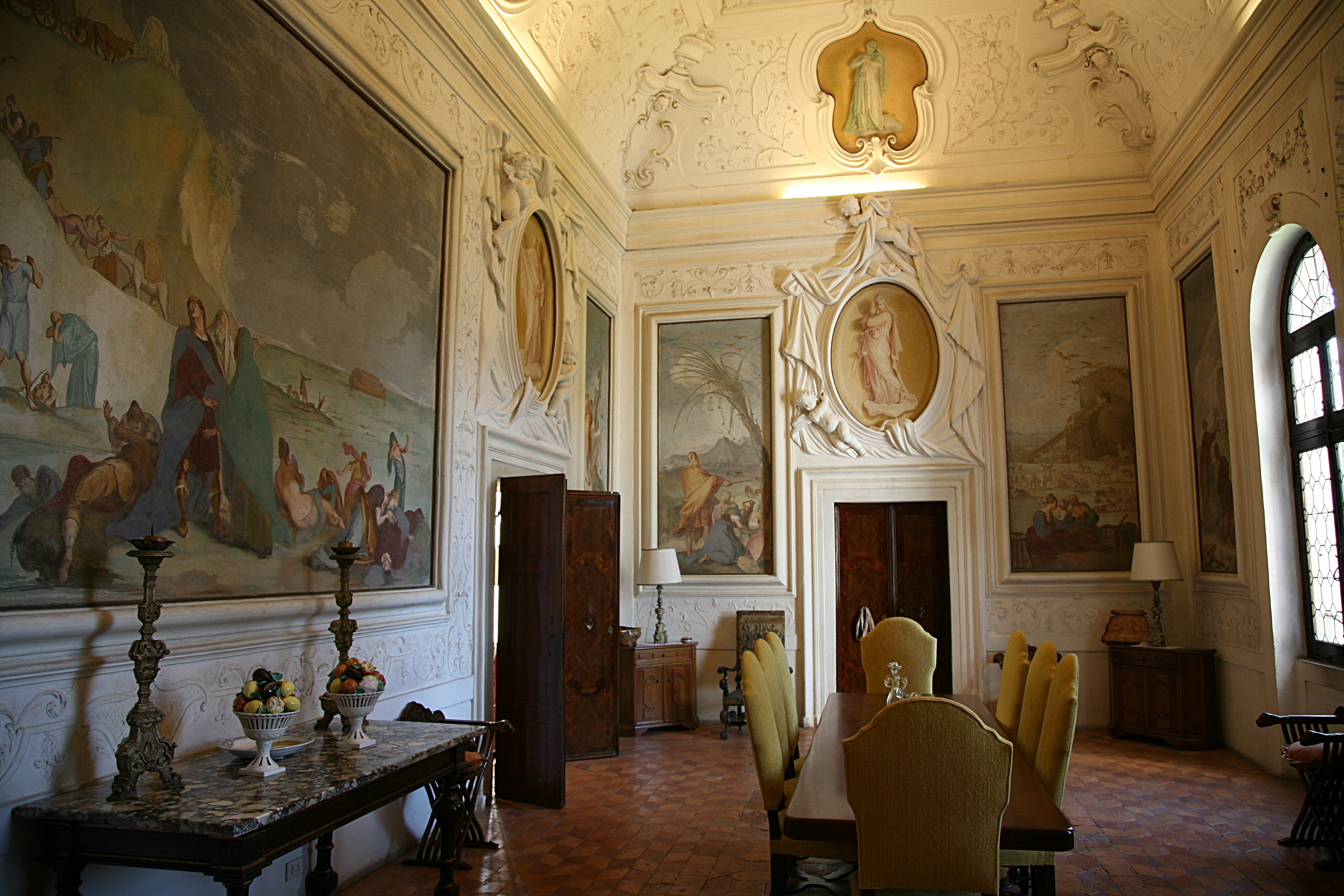
Interior of Villa Cornaro by Andrea Palladio (taken by Hans A. Rosbach)

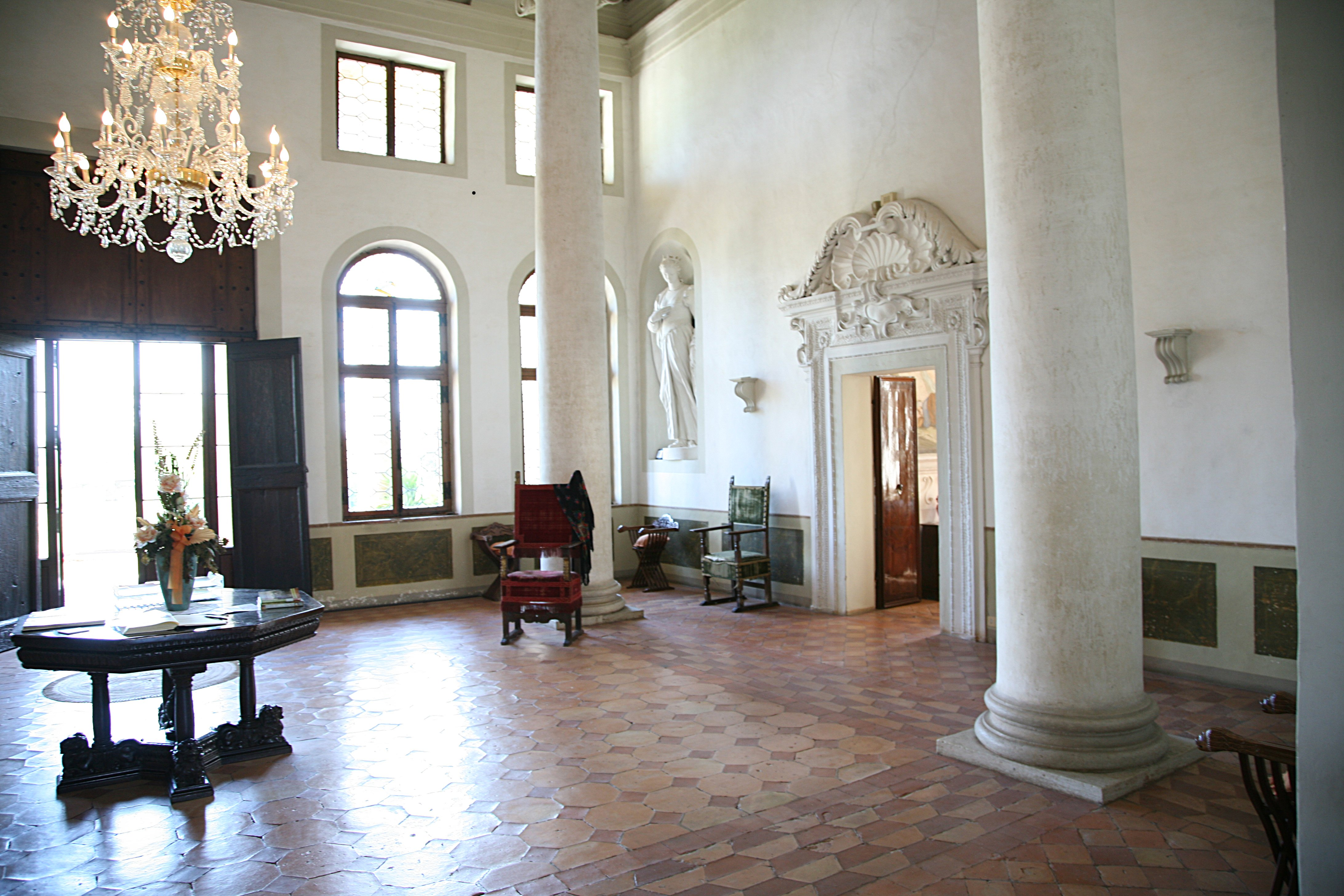
Main Hall, Villa Cornaro at Piombino Dese by Andrea Palladio (taken by Hans A. Rosbach

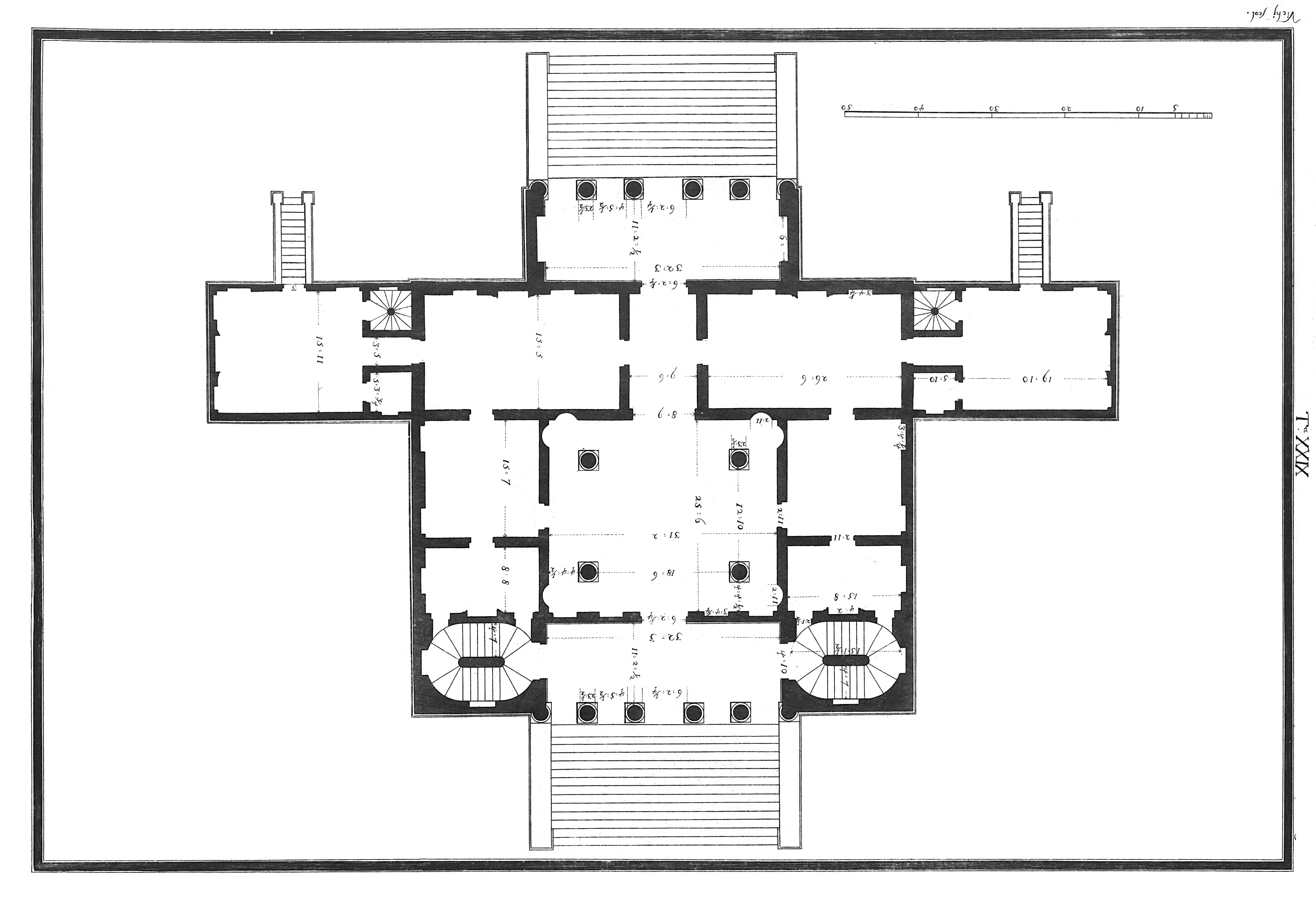
Ground plan by Bertotti Scamozzi, 1781

== See also ==
- Palladian architecture
- Palladian Villas of the Veneto
