= Camillo Mariani =

Italian sculptor (1565–1611)

Camillo Mariani (1565 in Vicenza – 1611 in Rome) was a major Italian sculptor whose work bridged the artistic worlds of Venice and Rome, forming a base for the Baroque style of the seventeenth century.

== Biography ==
Camillo Mariani was born in 1565 in Vicenza, Italy. His father Antonio, a native of Siena in the Tuscany region, fled to the Veneto after the fall of Siena to Florence in 1555. Camillo received his artistic training in the established Vicenza workshop of Lorenzo Rubini and his sons Agostino and Vigilio.

By fortunate coincidence, Mariani’s connection with the Rubini workshop drew him into a sculpture tradition tracing back to Rome and the Vatican, because Lorenzo Rubini’s wife, Margherita, was the sister of Alessandro Vittoria, the protégé and successor to the leading Venetian sculptor and architect Jacopo Sansovino. Sansovino, in turn, was trained in Rome, where he established an important reputation before being forced to flee the city in 1527 when it was sacked by the forces of the Holy Roman Emperor. The indirect connection to the Roman artistic scene certainly influenced Mariani’s work stylistically, and one may speculate that it also played a part in his decision to move his own studio to Rome in 1597.

Before moving to Rome and the Papal court, however, Mariani received a number of prestigious commissions in Venice and the Veneto, benefiting from his connections with the Rubinis and Vittoria, as well as with the Vicentine architect Vincenzo Scamozzi. After working with Agostino Rubini and other established sculptors of the region in producing statues for Andrea Palladio’s Teatro Olimpico in Vicenza, he moved on to create three of the statues—Aeolus, Proserpine and Hymen—surmounting the roofline of Sansovino’s Biblioteca Marciana in the Piazza di San Marco in Venice. (Alas, Hymen was destroyed when the nearby bell tower of the Basilica of San Marco collapsed in 1902.).

The masterworks of Mariani’s Veneto period resulted from his commission to produce six more-than-lifesize sculptures of historic ancestors of the Cornaro family for the family’s Palladio-designed Villa Cornaro in Piombino Dese. The statues, one scholar has noted, "are characterized by a largeness of form, an emotive intensity and expressive movement." The figures, another suggests, "project themselves into space, stretching to escape their niches with their gestures and establish a rapport with the viewer.

After moving his studio to Rome in 1597, Mariani immediately found his place in the Roman and Vatican art scene. By 1600 he was admitted to membership in the Virtuosi al Pantheon, the city’s oldest social organization; membership in the Accademia di San Luca followed in 1604.

He executed many prestigious commissions in Rome for Pope Clement VIII and Pope Paul V, including included statues for the Chapel of Clement VIII at St. Peter’s Basilica; later he was called upon to execute four angels for St. Peter’s baldacchino mobile. He completed other major sculpture projects for Church of the Lateran, the Pantheon, and the churches of Santa Maria sopra Minerva and Santa Maria Maggiore. The masterworks of his Roman period, however, were eight stucco saints executed for the Church of San Bernardo alle Terme. These figures, according to one scholar, "demonstrate his importance to the development of the early Baroque. . . . Mariani raised the art of stucco sculpture to an unprecedented position in Rome." His figures both at San Bernardo alle Terme in Rome and at Villa Cornaro in Piombino Dese are particularly praised for their chiaroscuro effects and bold modeling.

Mariani died in Rome in 1611 at the age of 46 and is buried at the Church of Santa Susanna. His early death cut short his growing reputation and influence in Roman and Papal art circles.

Stucco statues of Saints in San Bernardo alle Terme

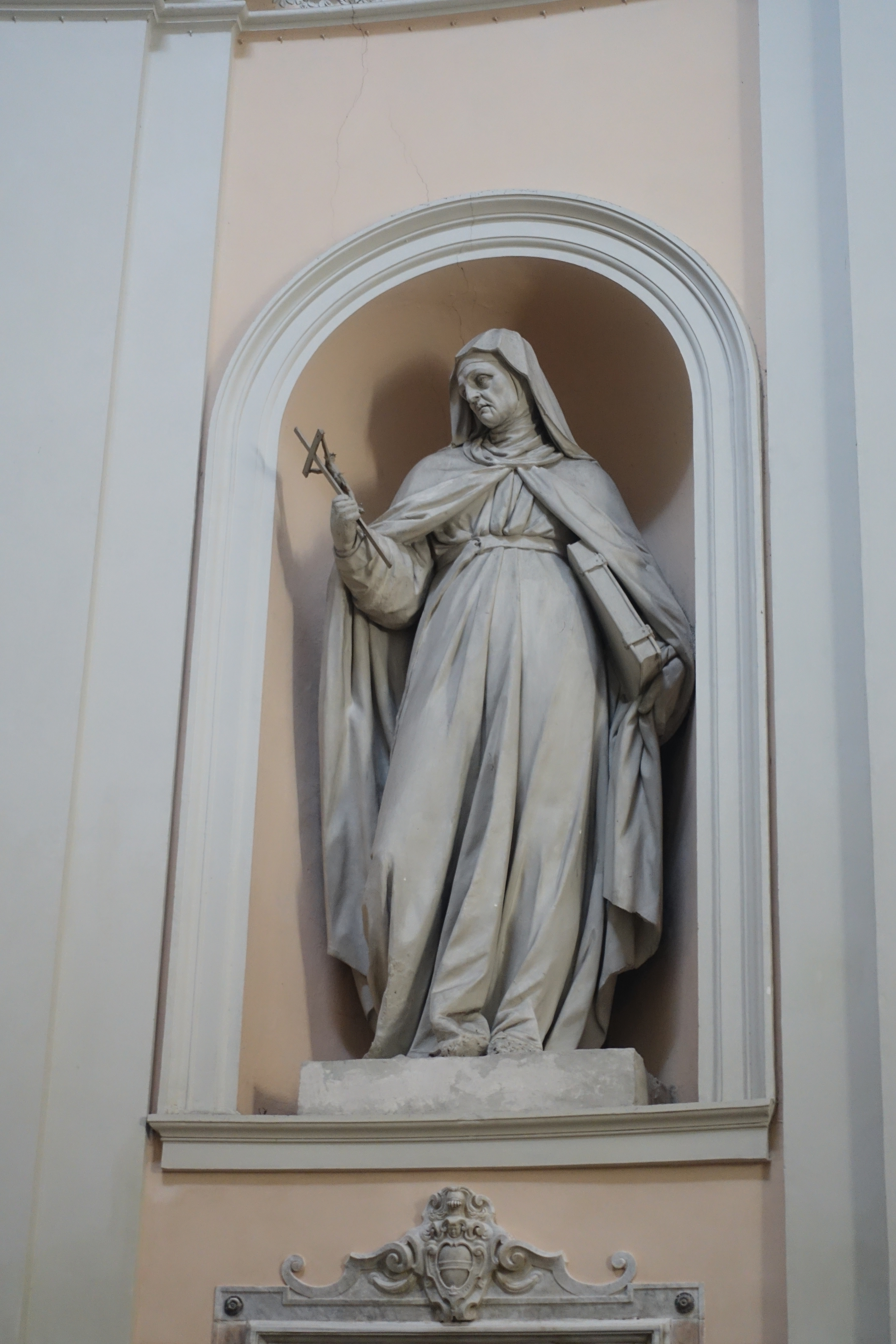
Monica

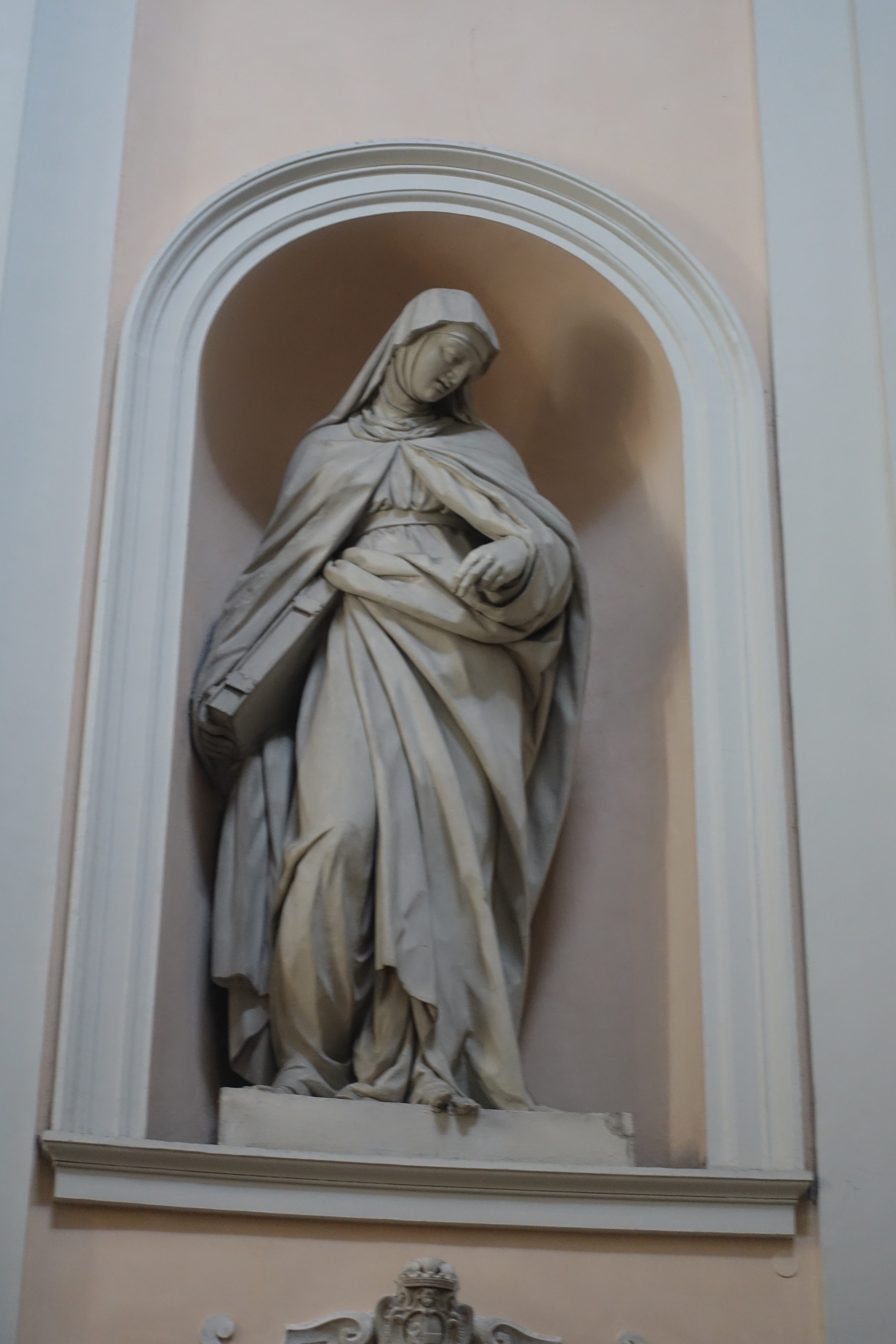
Catherine of Siena

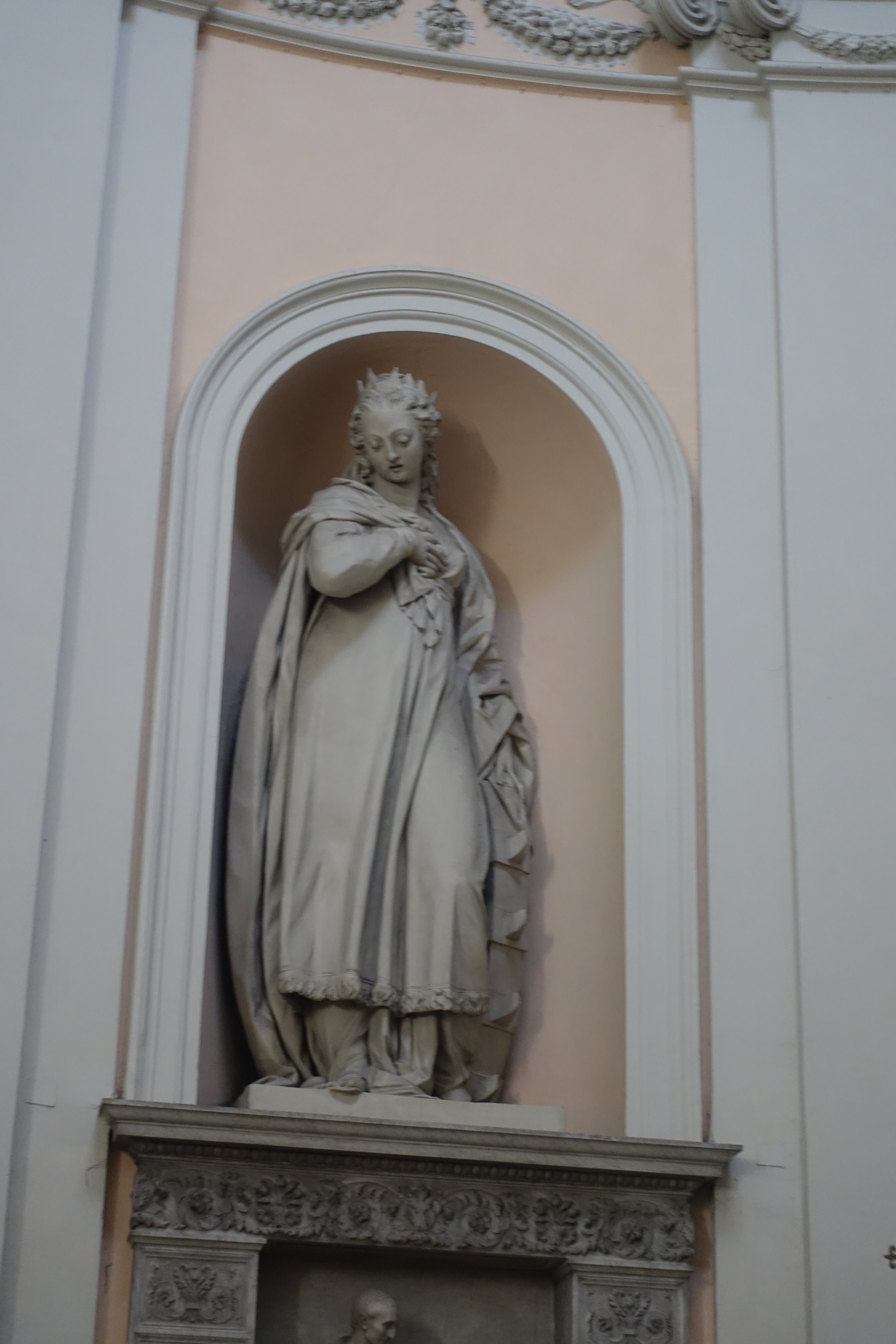
Catherine of Alexandria

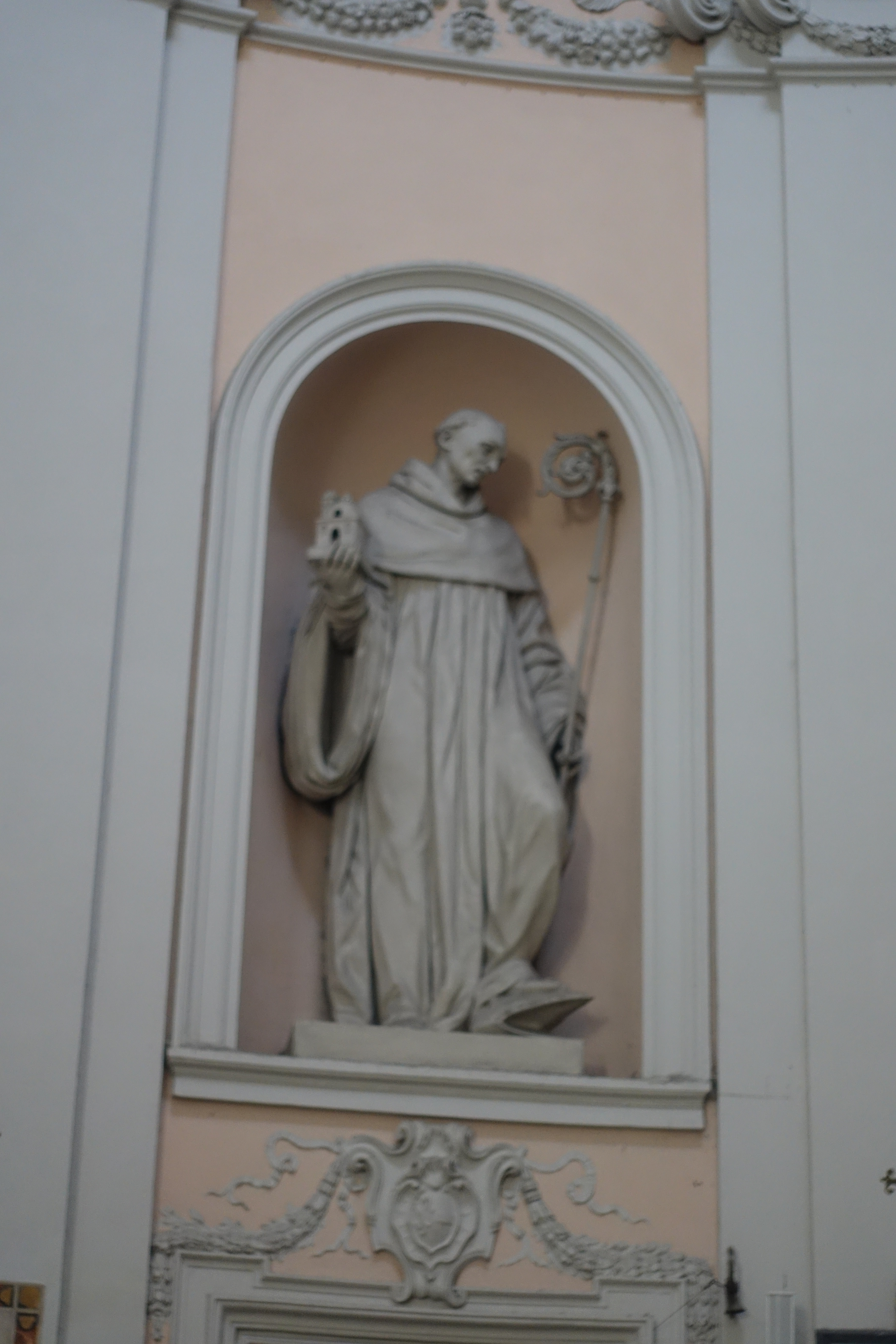
Bernard

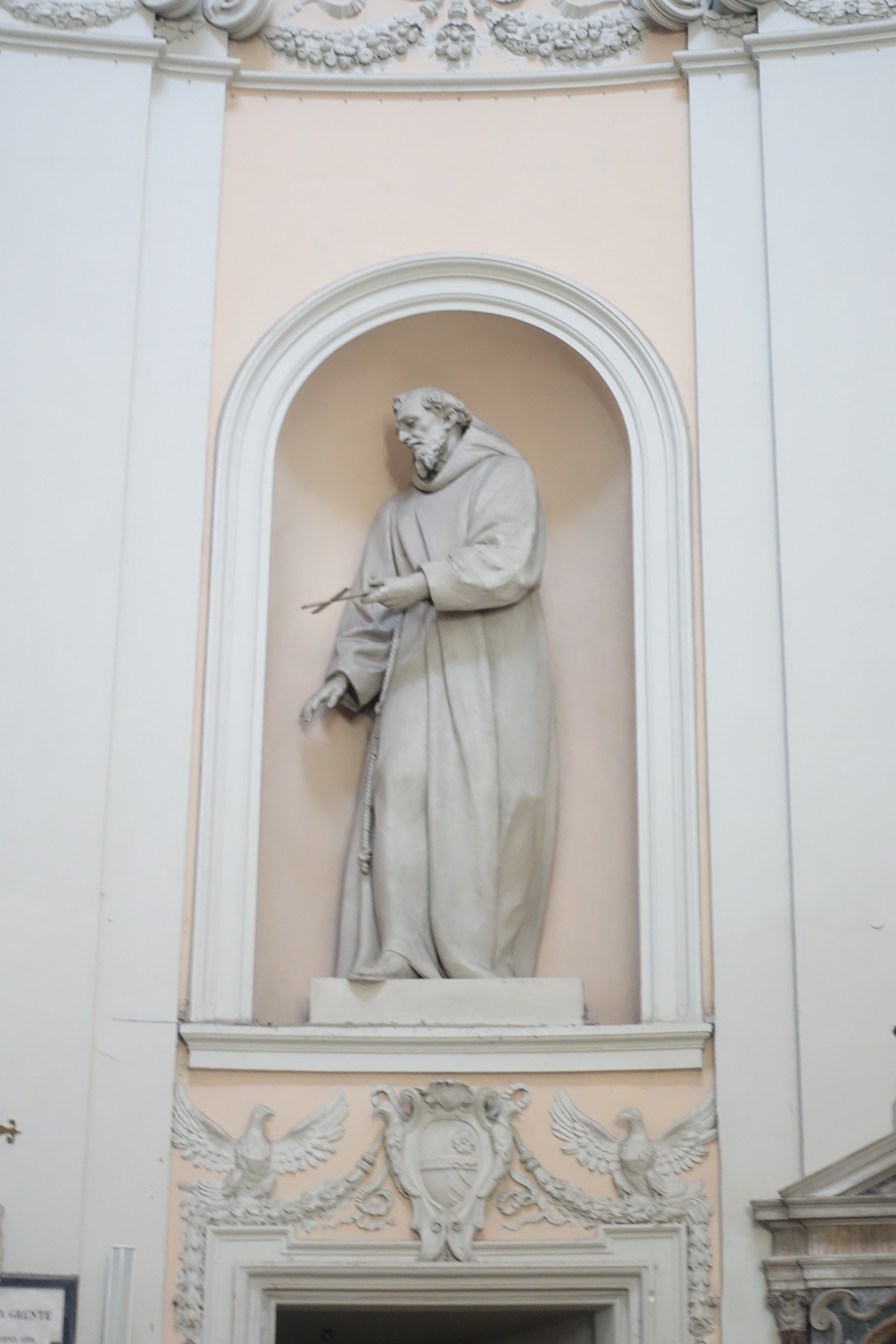
Francis of Assisi

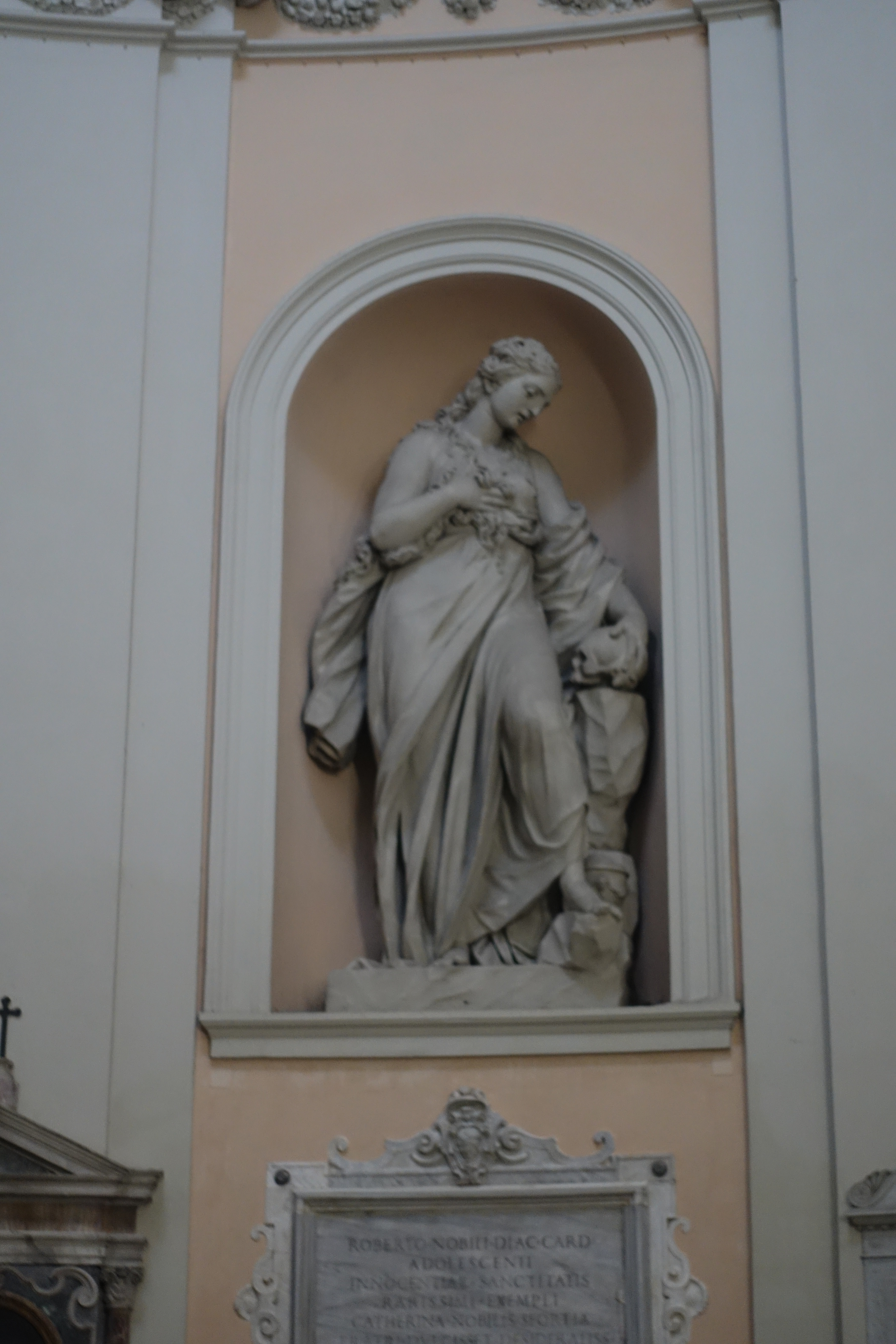
Mary Magdalen

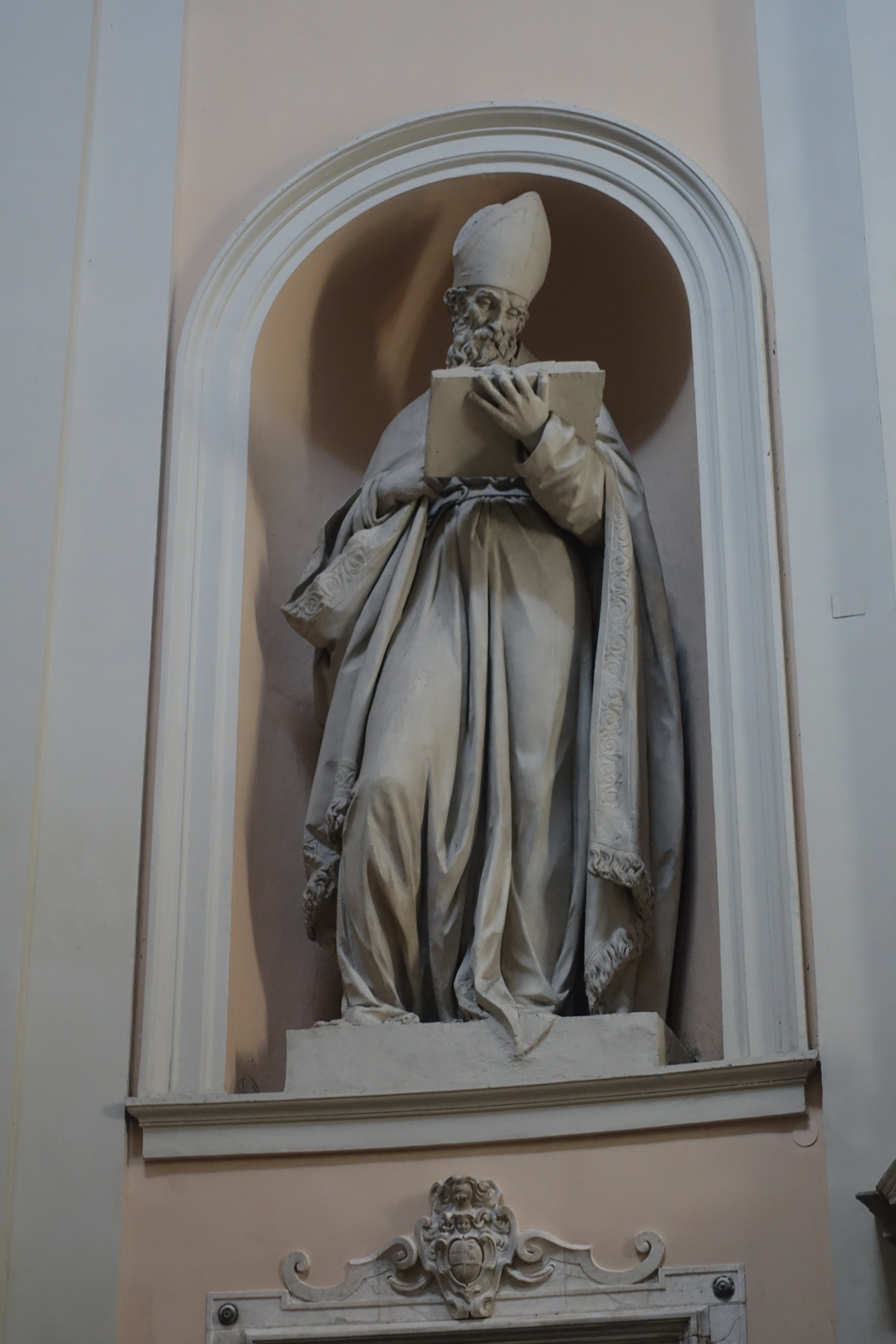
Augustine

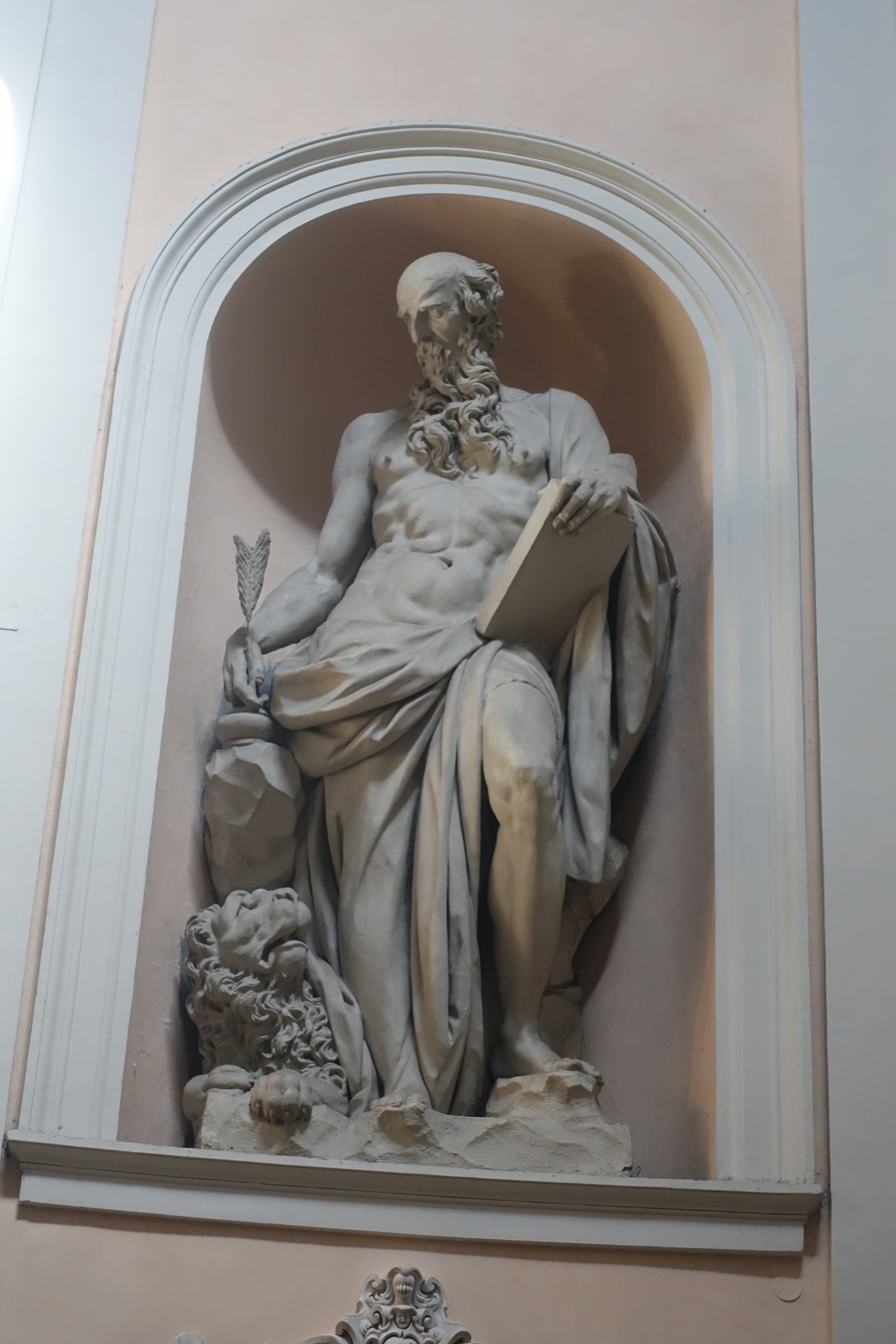
Jerome

== Sources ==
- Baglione, Giuseppe, Le Vite de’ Pittori Scultore et Architetti (Rome, 1642; Vatican City, 1995, edited by J. Hess and H. Röttgen)
- Burns, R. C., Camillo Mariani: Catalyst of the Sculpture of the Roman Baroque, doctoral thesis, Johns Hopkins University, Baltimore, 1980.
- De Lotto, Maria Teresa, Saggi e memorie di storia dell’ arte 32: Camillo Mariani (Venice: Fondazione Giorgio Cini, 2009). ISBN 978 8822259738.
- Fiocco, Giuseppe, "Camillo Mariani," Le Arti, vol. 3 (1940-1941), pp. 74–86.
- Fiocco, Giuseppe, "Camillo Mariani e Palladio," Bolletino de Centro Internazionale di Studi di Archetettura Andrea Palladio, vol. 10 (1968), pp. 164–169.
- Martinelli, Valentino, "Le prime sculture di Camillo Mariani a Roma," Atti del XVIII Congresso Internazionali di Storia dell'Arte, 1955 (Venezia, 1957 ), pp. 306–311.
- Middeldorf, Ulrich, "Camillo Mariani, Scultore-Pittore," The Burlington Magazine (1976), pp. 500– 504.
- Ostrow, Stephen, "Mariani, Camillo," The Grove Dictionary of Art, edited by Jane Turner (London, 1996), vol. 20, pp. 412–413.
- Piatti, Francesca, Camillo Mariani e i Rapporti fra Roma e Vicenza sulla Scorcio del Cinquecento, laureate thesis, Università degli Studi di Roma Tre, Facoltà di Lettere e Filosofia, 2000.
