= DESE Research =

DESE Research, Inc.
- Type: Veteran-Owned, Small Business
- Industry: Defense
- Founded: Huntsville, Alabama (1982)
- Headquarters: Huntsville, Alabama
- Key people: Wallace Kirkpatrick, CEO; Michael Kirkpatrick, President
- Website: www.dese.com

DESE Research, Inc., is a veteran-owned, small-business firm conducting Theoretical and Analytical Research Services in the fields of Defense, Energy, Space, and Environment. DESE was formed in 1982 by former U.S. Army Civil-Service Executive Dr. Wallace E. Kirkpatrick. In Addition to Research Accomplishments, DESE is recognized for high Ethical Standards and Leadership in Community Services.

== Locations ==
Corporate headquarters and primary operations are in the Cummings Research Park, Huntsville, Alabama. The firm also has offices serving Washington, D.C. and Leavenworth, Kansas.

== Organization and management ==
=== Corporate managers ===
Chief executive officer – Michael A. Kirkpatrick
President – Michael A. Kirkpatrick
Senior Vice-President of Business Development – David F. Hemingway
Senior Vice-President of Enterprise Architecture – Shawn Wilson
Administration – Patricia Guinn

=== Directorates ===
Advanced Technology – H. Ray Sells
Cyber Security Programs – Bernie Froehlich
Leavenworth Operations – William E. Gevedon
Missile Systems Development – William T. Naff, Ph.D.
Simulation Applications – Dewayne Hall
Supply Chain Research – Bill Killingsworth, Ph.D
Systems Engineering and Test – Victor Dlugoszewski

== Primary customers ==
At the present and in recent years, the client base of DESE has included the following Government Agencies and Business Industries.

=== Government agencies ===
Army Aviation and Missile Command; Army Combined Arms Center; Army Installation Management Command; Army Space and Missile Defense Command; Army Test and Evaluation Command; Army Training and Doctrine Command; Defense Intelligence Agency (Missile and Space Intelligence Center); Defense Threat Reduction Agency; Joint Systems Integration Center; Missile Defense Agency: NASA Marshall Space Flight Center; and Oak Ridge National Laboratory. DESE Research is certified by the General Services Administration under Professional Engineering Services and Information Technology Services.

=== Business industries ===
Boeing Company; Oshkosh Defense, LLC., CAS Group/Wyle; COLSA Corporation; Computer Sciences Corporation; Dynetics; General Dynamics; L3 Communications; Lockheed Martin Missiles and Space; Raytheon Company; Science Applications International Corporation; Teledyne Brown Engineering; plus others, mainly Small Businesses.

== Areas of specialization ==
DESE offers the following primary areas of expertise and recently developed tools and processes.

=== Areas of expertise ===
Advanced software development; cyber security; database engineering; enterprise architecture; independent validation and verification; information assurance; intelligence, surveillance, and reconnaissance; interoperability certification; missile research and development; modeling and simulation; requirements analysis; test and evaluation; threat assessment; training; weapon system design.

DESE has received contracts, subcontracts, or Small Business Innovative Research (SBIR) awards in these areas. A number of the activities resulted in published papers and patents.

=== Simulation tools and processes ===
DESE is recognized for developing simulation and modeling software tools. NASA's heavy-lift vehicle projects use a DESE-developed code for their primary flight simulation In an unusual practice, DESE has made some of its simulations available to the public as open-source code, permitting users to study, change, improve, and, at times, distribute the software.

DESE literature cites the following recently developed and used major tools and processes.

- C++ Model Developer – simulation kernel for quickly building dynamic simulations
- Digital Glue – scripting languages to make software interoperable
- T-Frames – universal architecture for high-fidelity missile engagement simulations
- MAVERIC – high-fidelity simulation used in developing heavy-lift vehicles
- Genetic Algorithms – optimization technique using survival-of-the fittest principles
- Mini-Rocket – easy-to configure, multiple-degree-of-freedom flyout trajectory model
- Collection Asset Visualization – optimizing location of intelligence sensors
- Flight Path threat assessment – identifying and avoiding MANPADS threat areas
- Battle Command Common Operational Architecture – JTF through Company HQs
- System-of-Systems Mission Threads – basis for Army Interoperability Certification
