= Alessandro Vittoria =

Italian sculptor (1525–1608)

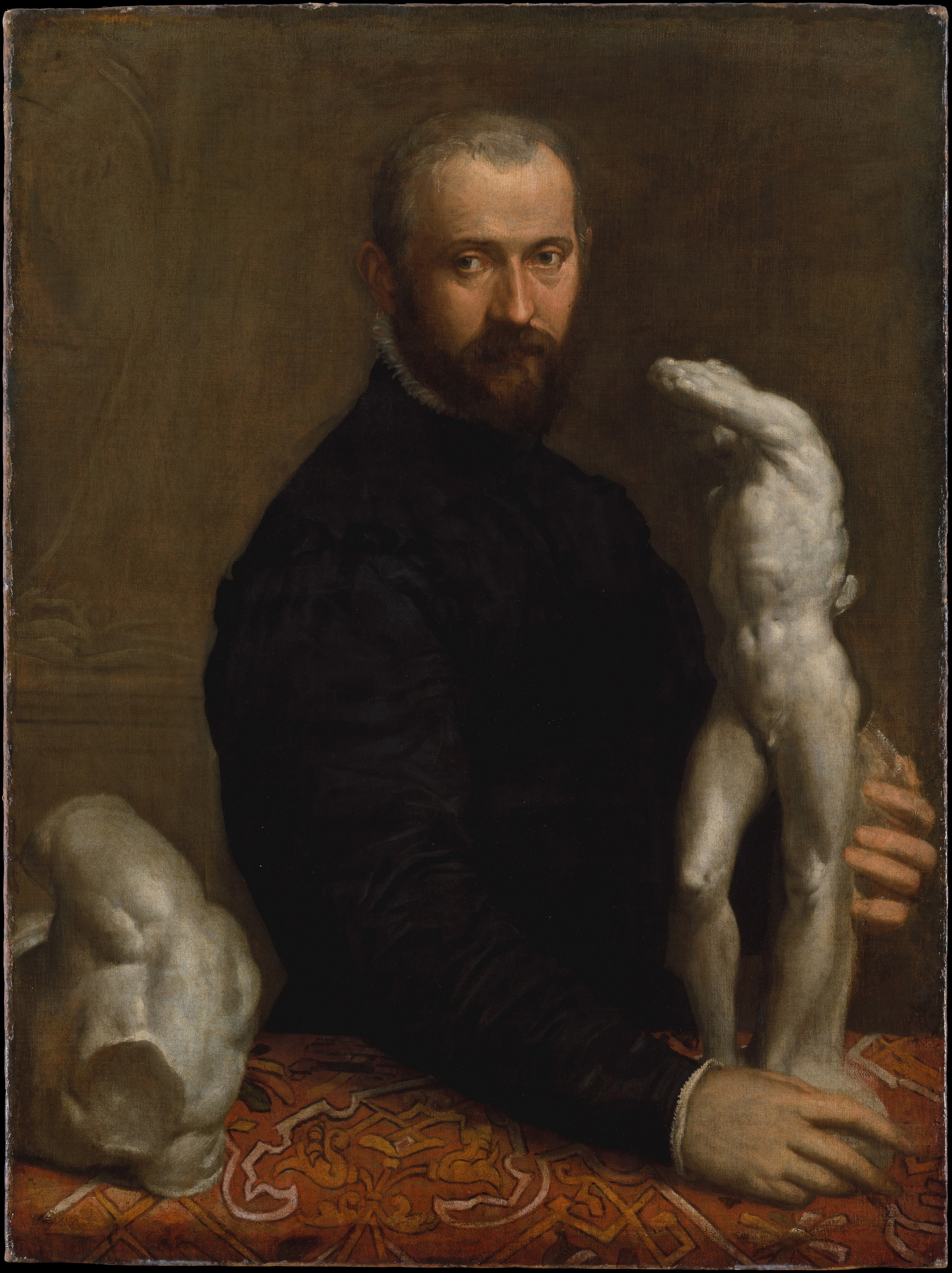
Alessandro Vittoria portrayed by Paolo Veronese, c. 1580

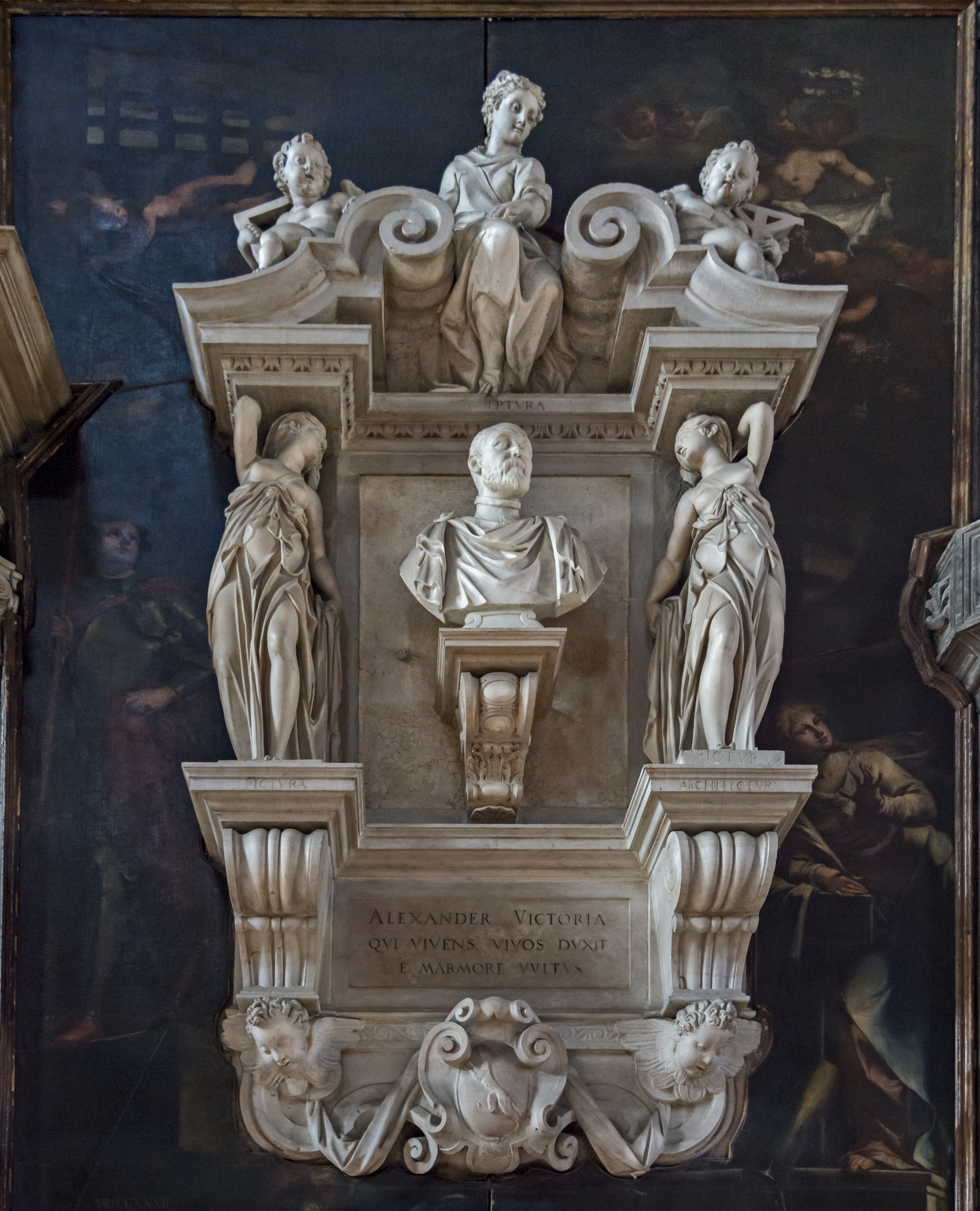
Alessandro Vittoria funerary monument, San Zaccaria, Venice

Alessandro Vittoria (1525 – 27 May 1608) was an Italian Mannerist sculptor of the Venetian school, "one of the main representatives of the Venetian classical style" and rivalling Giambologna as the foremost sculptors of the late 16th century in Italy, producing works such as Annunciation (Art Institute of Chicago).

== Biography ==
Vittoria was born Alessandro Vittoria di Vigilio della Volpa, in Trento, Italy, in what is now northern Italy, and was the son of a tailor. Vittoria was trained in the atelier of the architect-sculptor Jacopo Sansovino; he was a contemporary of Titian whose influence can be detected in his compositions. He was a virtuoso in terracotta, often presented with gilded surfaces, marble and bronze. Like all Italian sculptors of his generation, Vittoria was influenced also by Michelangelo and by the Florentine Mannerist, Bartolomeo Ammannati. The closeness of his associations in projects by architects Sansovino, Sanmicheli and Palladio, working with painters Titian, Tintoretto and Veronese placed him squarely among the protagonists of the art world in late 16th-century Venice.

== Career ==
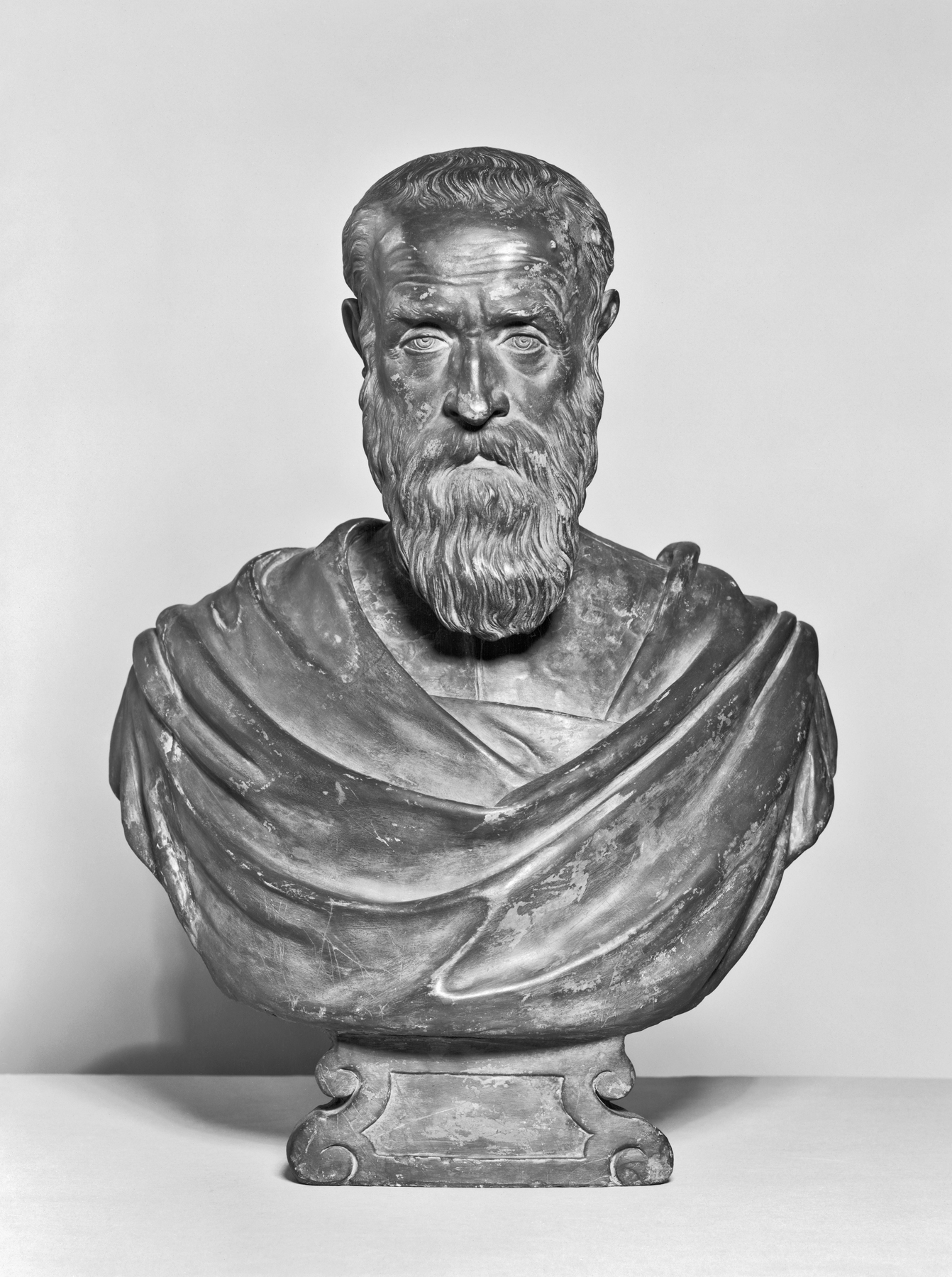
Bust of Marino Grimani, after 1599, terracotta with paint (Walters Art Museum)

Vittoria was first trained in his native city, Trento, then moved to Venice on 25 July 1543, where he trained and worked with Jacopo Sansovino. His long artistic relationship with Sansovino was a stormy one. After one quarrel with Sansovino, he removed from Venice and worked in Vicenza, where he collaborated with Veronese on the decorations of the Villa Barbaro at Maser (1560–62) before returning. The two masters worked jointly on great sculptural commissions until Sansovino's death. Vittoria took up his studio and completed Sansovino's unfinished commissions. His pupils included Camillo Mariani and Andrea di Alessandro.

Vittoria joined the Scuola Grande di San Marco on 24 January 1563 and the Accademia del Disegno, Florence, c. 1567.

He died at Venice on 27 May 1608. His tomb, with his self-portrait bust, is in the church of San Zaccaria.

Vittoria is known for his classicising portrait busts, a genre that scarcely existed in Venice before him, and for medals as well as for his full-length figures, some of which surmount Sansovino's Biblioteca Marciana.

== Sources ==
His diary is an important source for the details of his career, as is his will, of 29 July 1576. An exhibition at Trento, 1999 is memorialised in a catalogue by Andrea Bacchi, Lia Camerlengo and Manfred Leithe-Jasper, "La Bellissima Maniera": Alessandro Vittoria e la Scultura Veneta del Cinquecento (Trento 1999) which is the basic text for its introductory essays on Vittoria's art and career, by Manfred Leithe-Jasper; his patrons, by Thomas Martin; his connections with Venetian painting, by Stefano Tumidei; and Vittoria's role as a collector, by Victoria Avery.

== Gallery ==
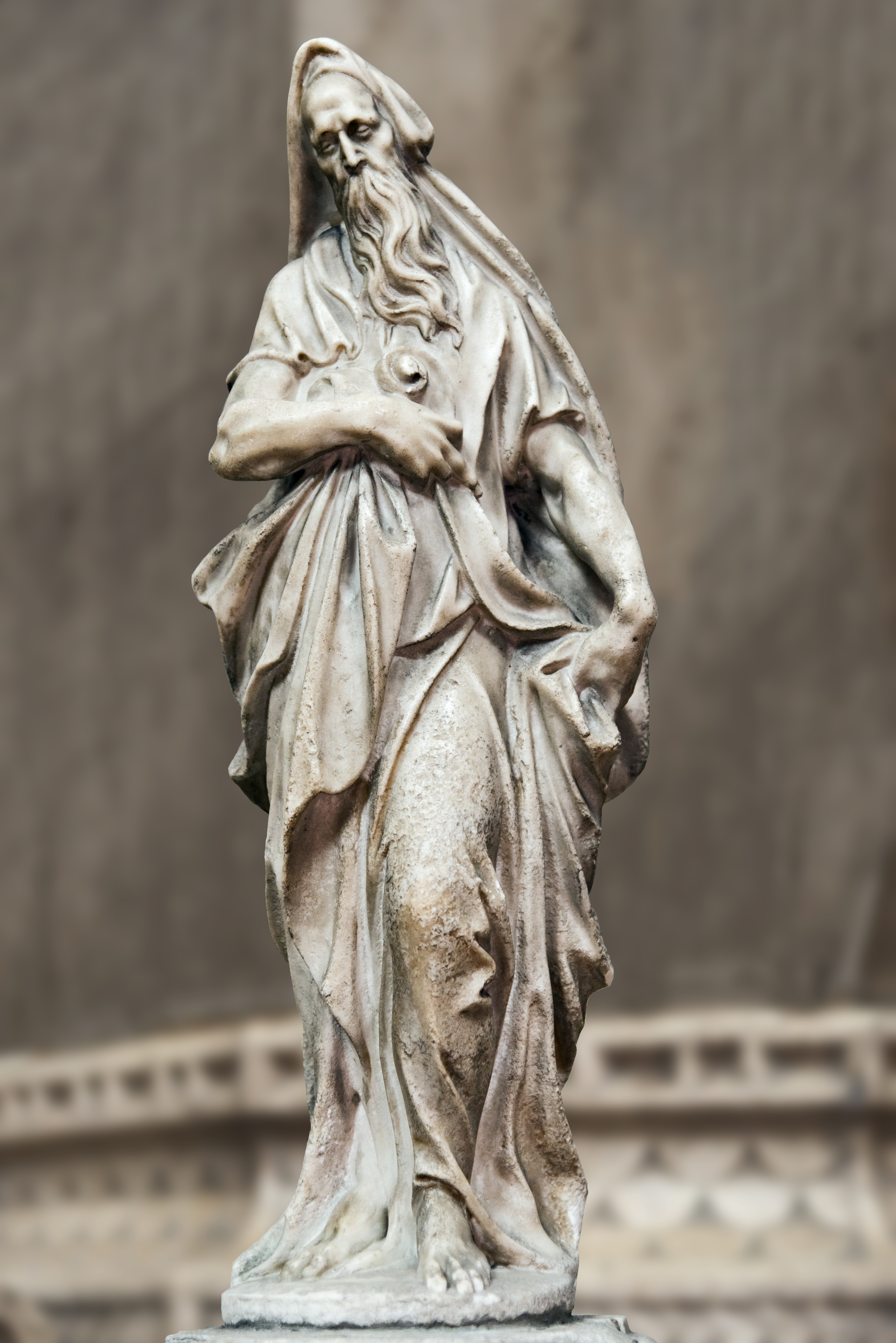
San Zaccaria, San Zaccaria, Venice

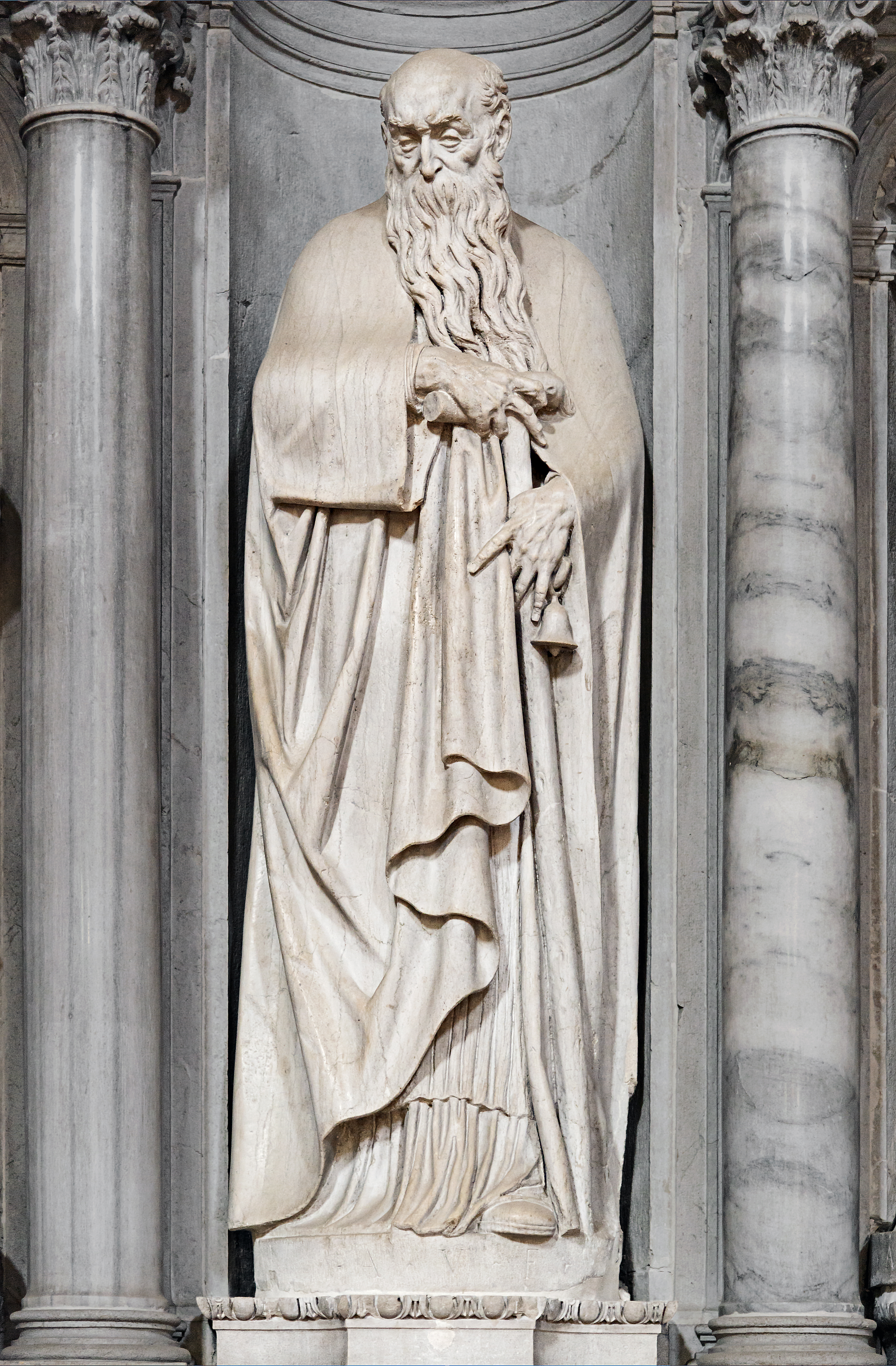
Anthony the Great, San Francesco della Vigna, Venice

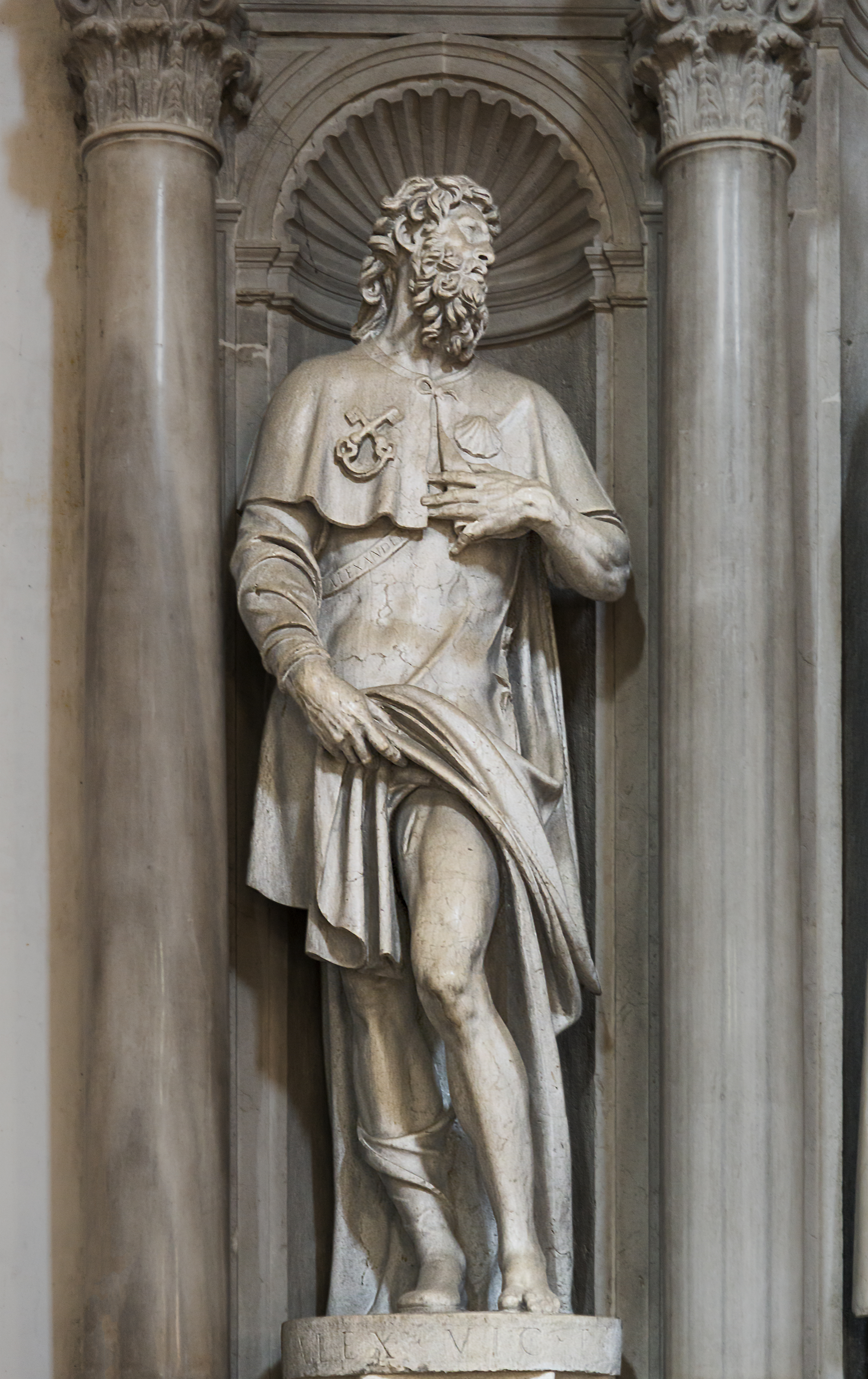
Saint Roch, San Francesco della Vigna, Venice

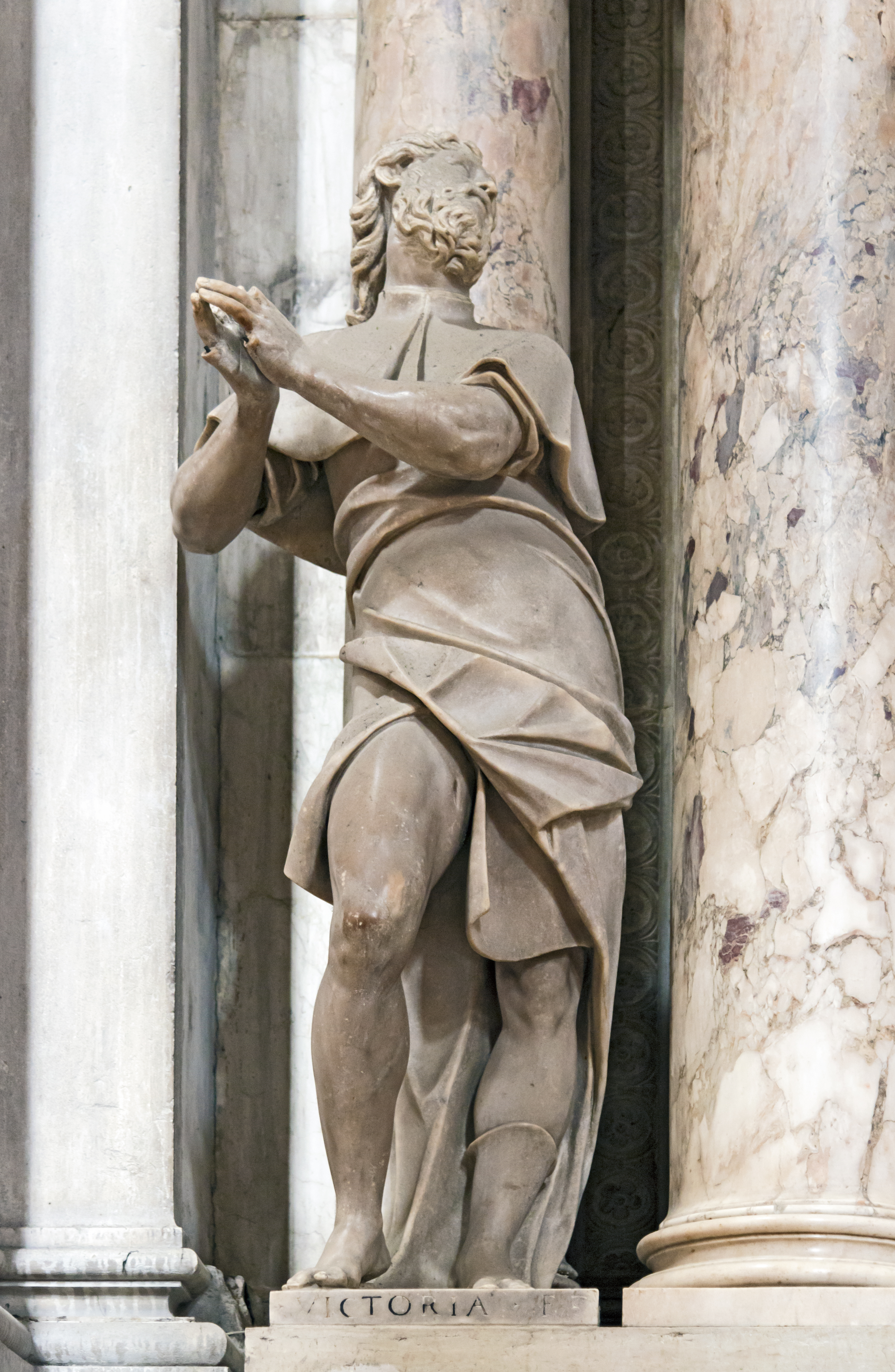
Saint Roch, San Salvador, Venice

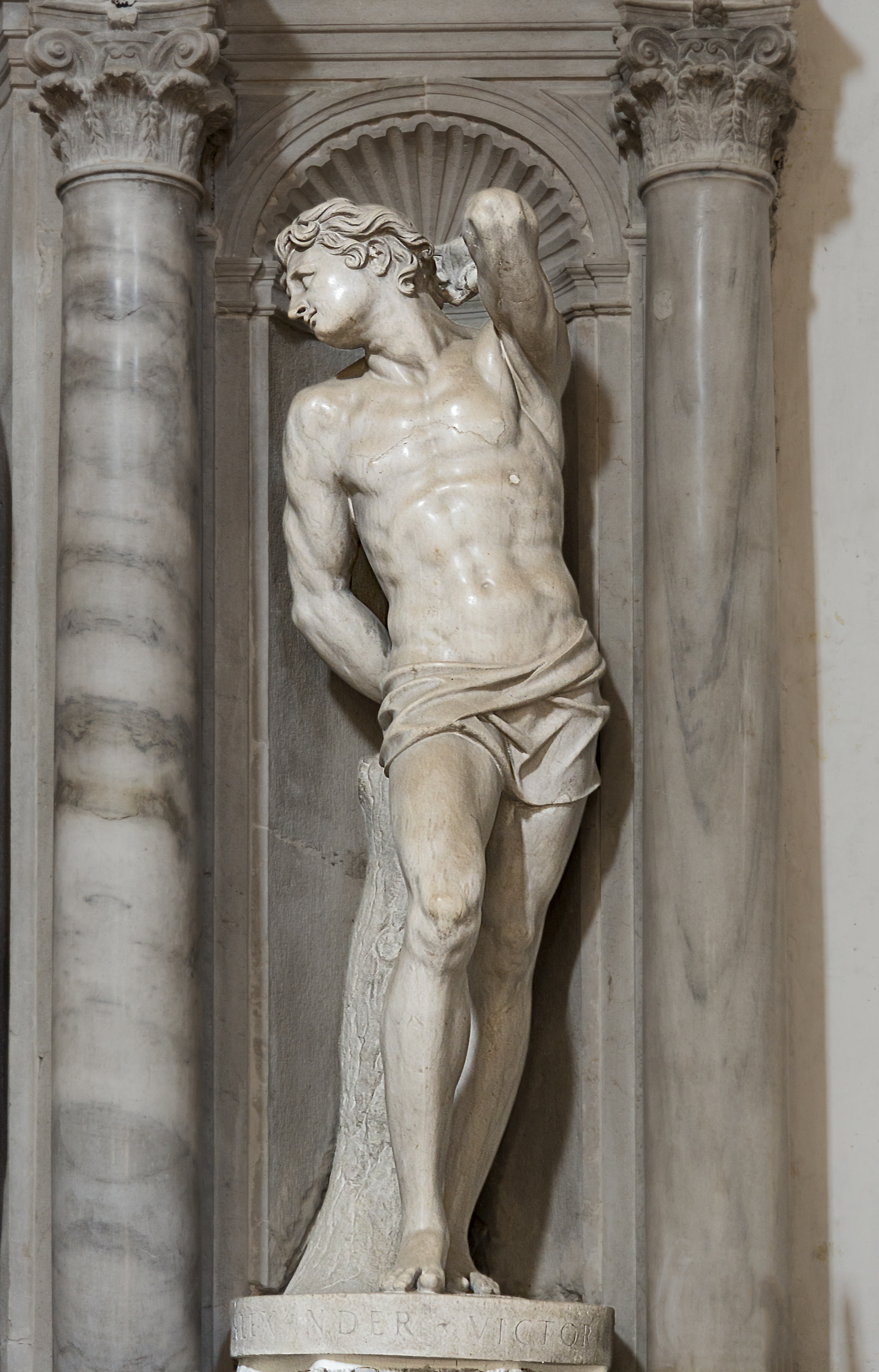
Saint Sebastian, San Francesco della Vigna, Venice

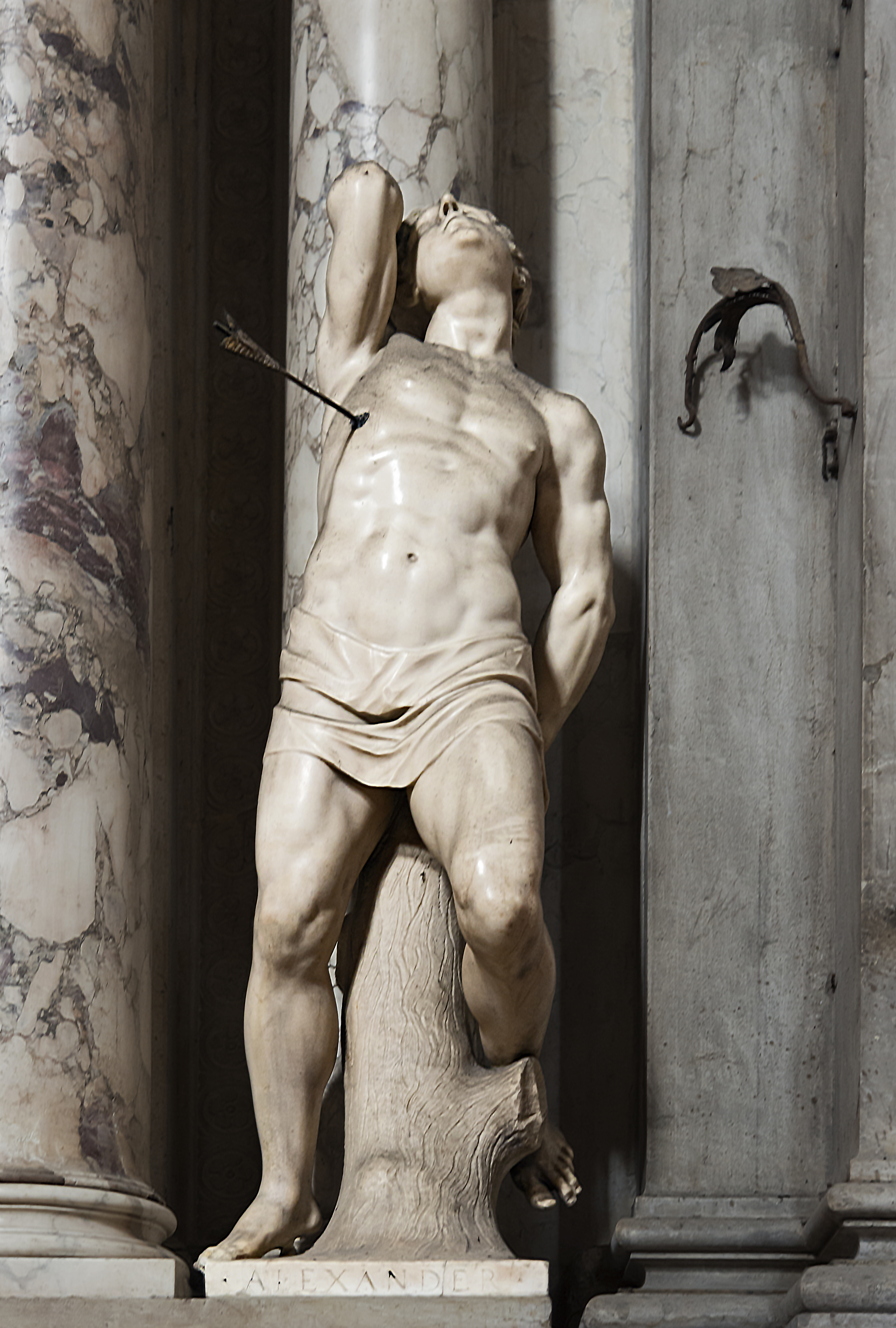
Saint Sebastian, San Salvador, Venice

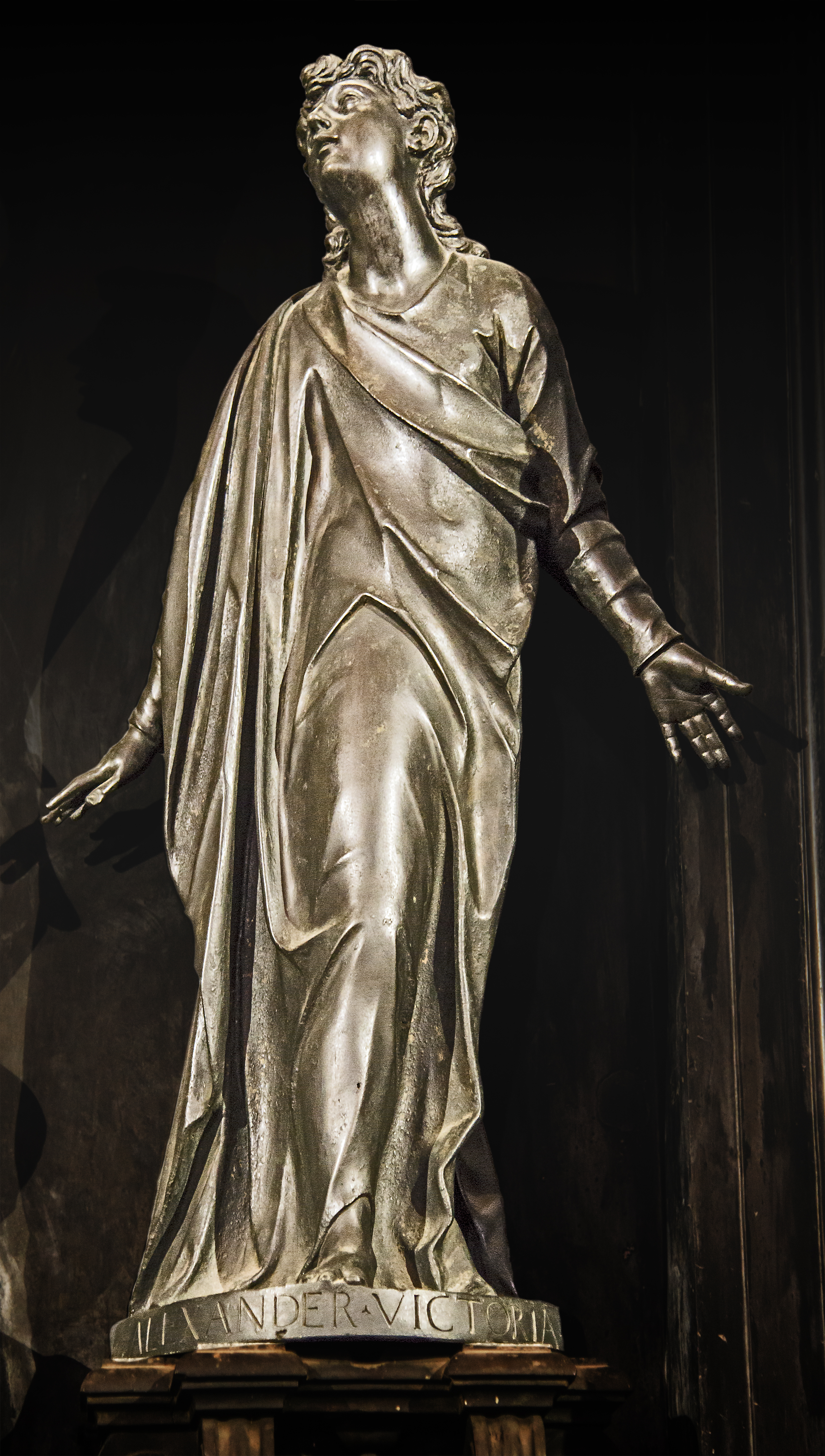
John the Evangelist, San Zanipolo, Venice

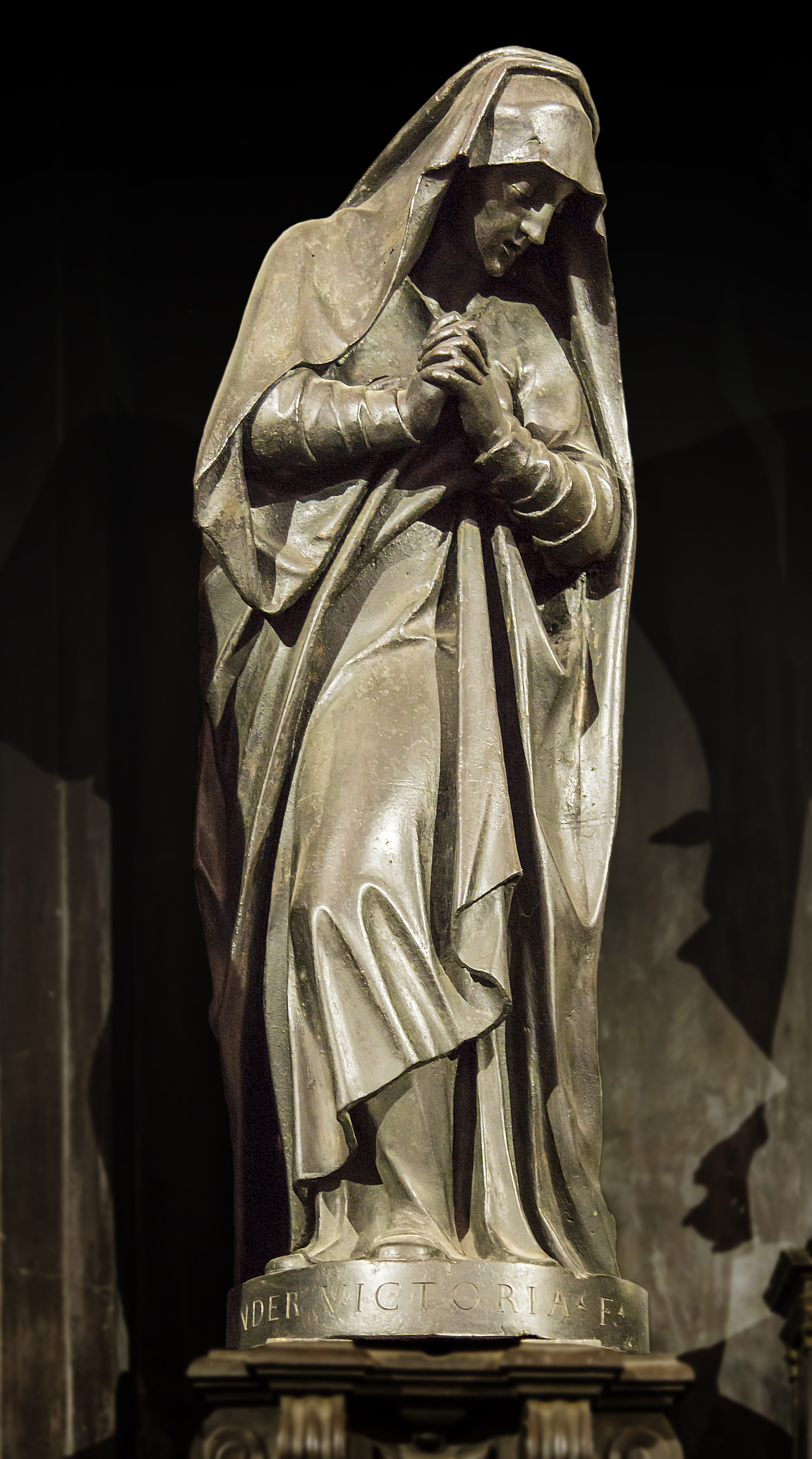
Virgin of pain, San Zanipolo, Venice

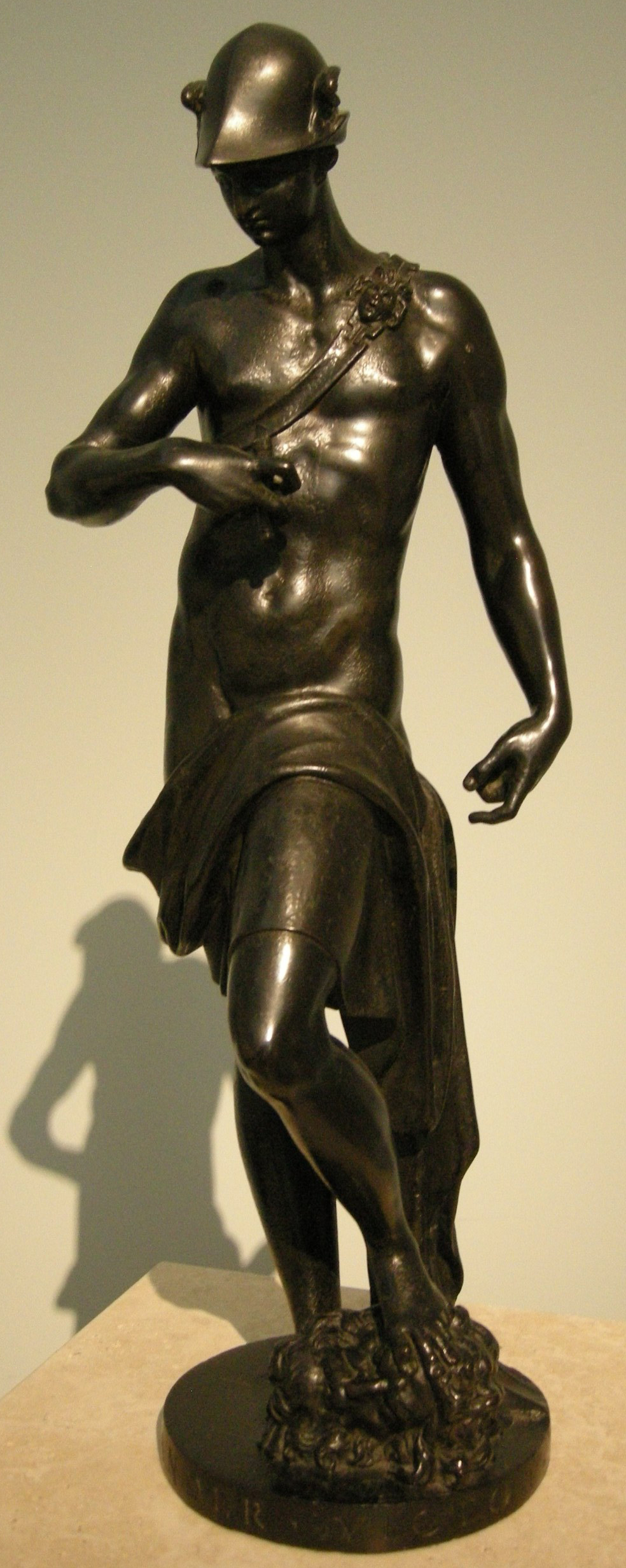

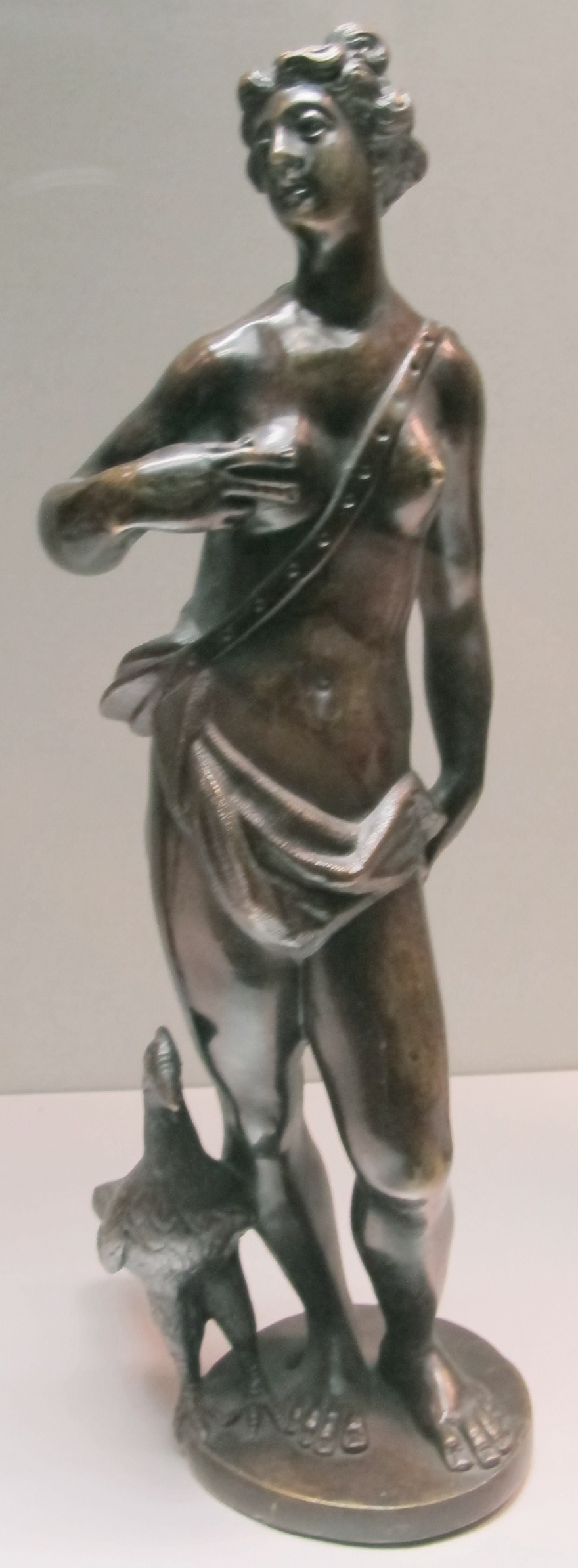

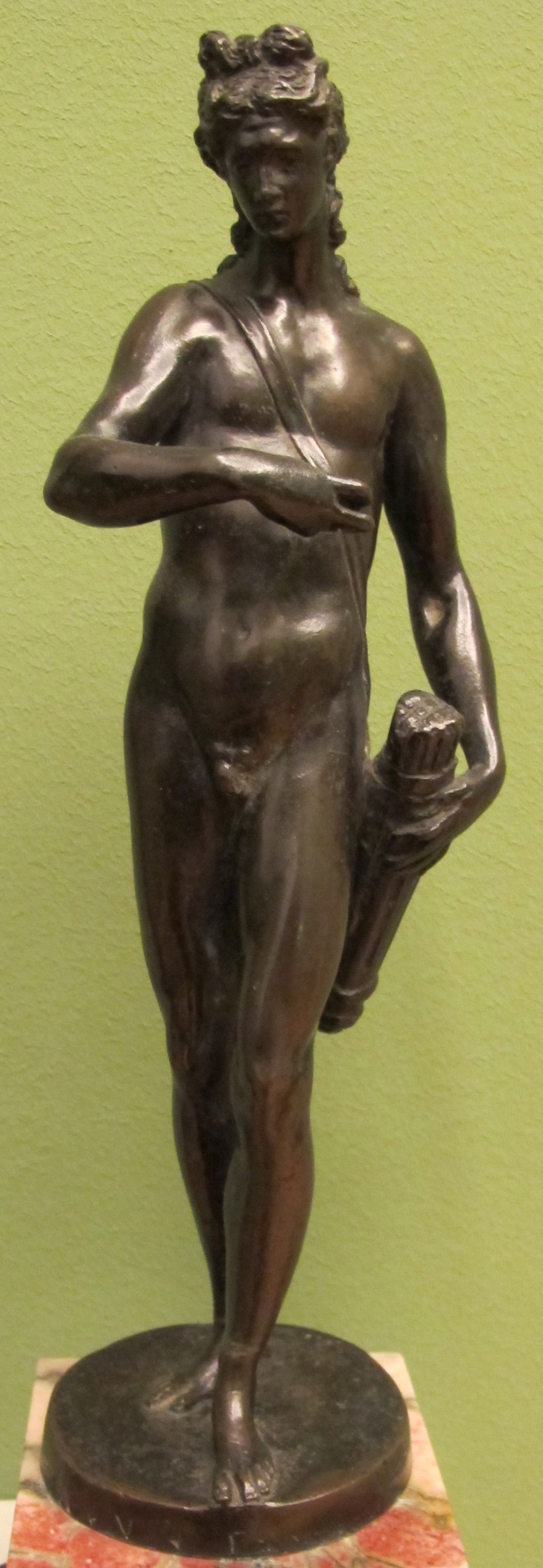

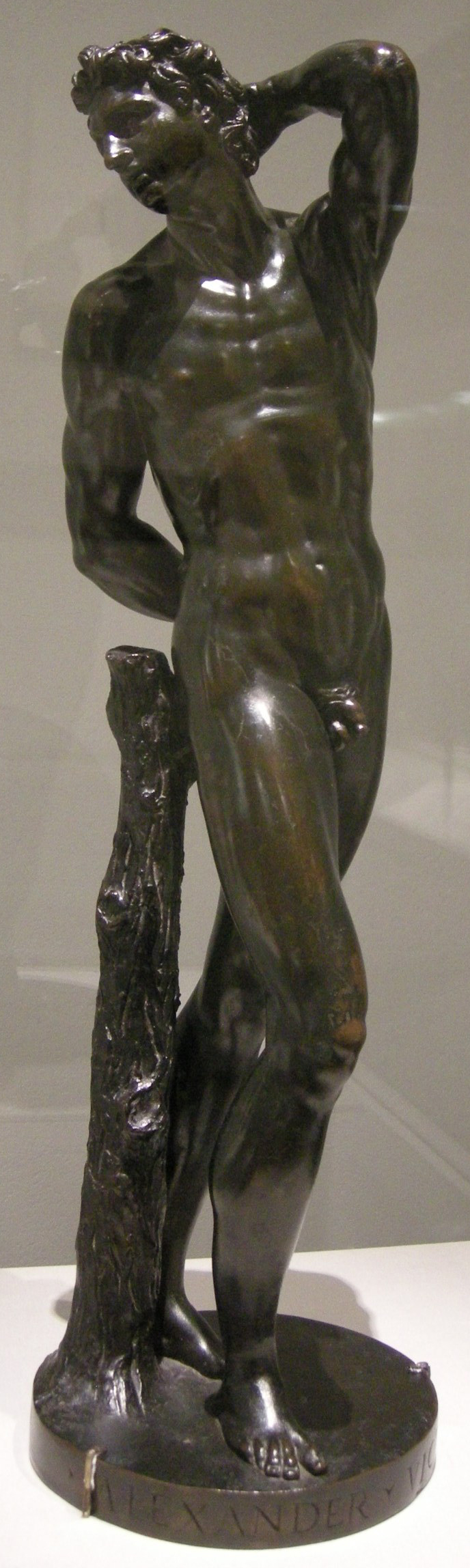

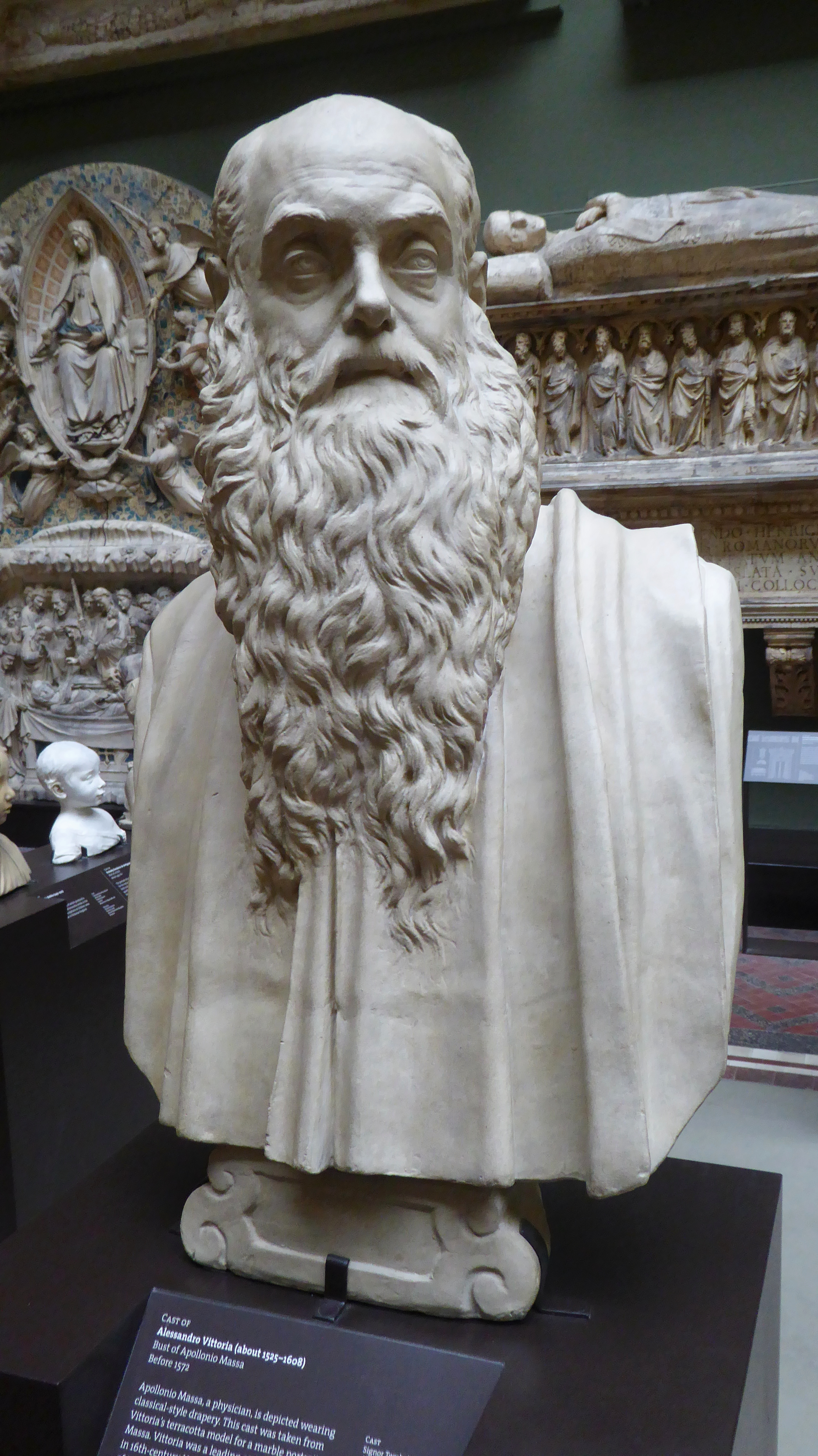
Cast of Vittoria's bust of Apollonio Massa
