= Annunciation (Vittoria) =

Bronze relief sculpture by Alessandro Vittoria

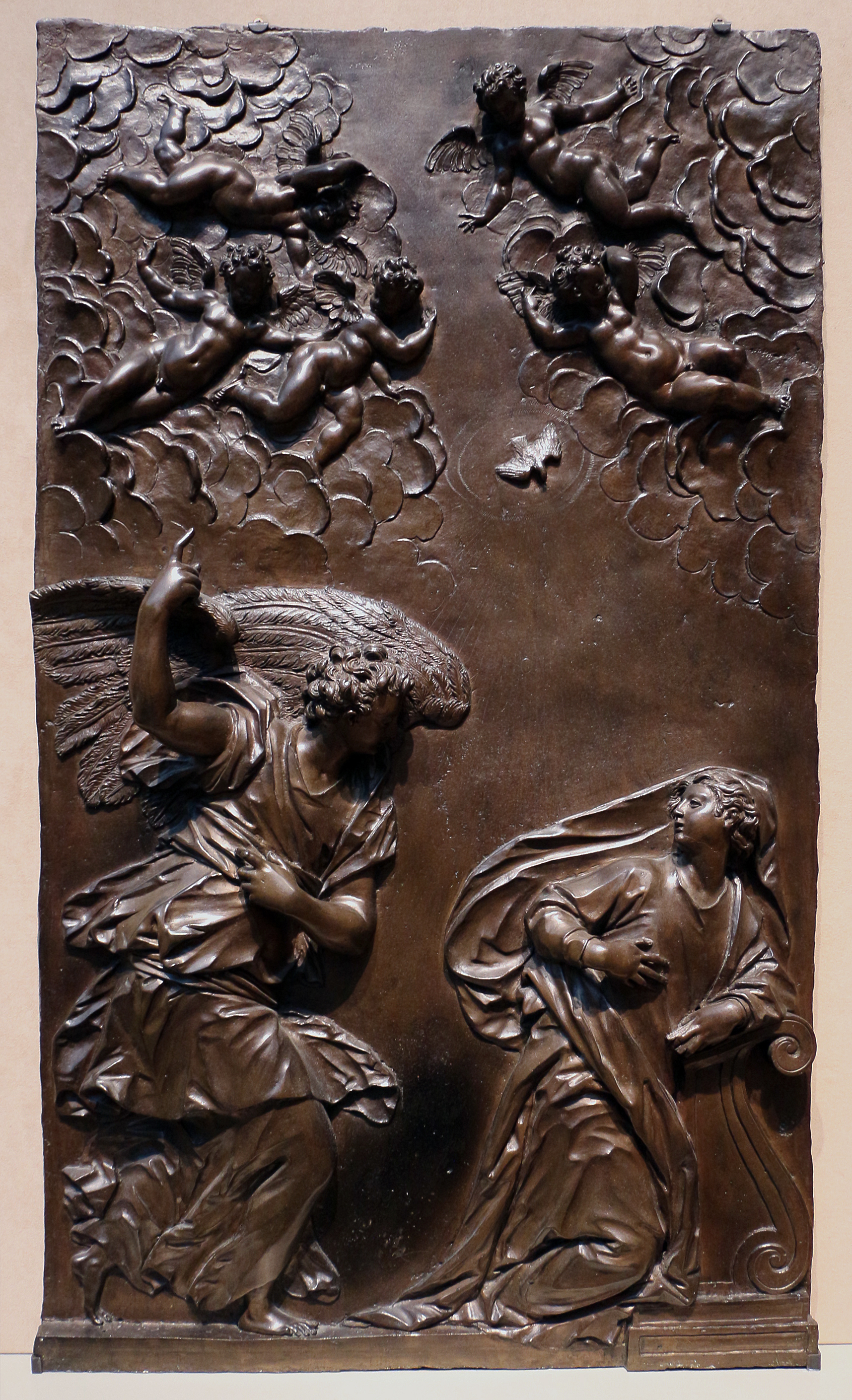
- Annunciation 8c. 1583) by Alessandro Vittoria
- Artist: Alessandro Vittoria
- Location: Art Institute of Chicago

Annunciation is a bronze relief of the Annunciation by Alessandro Vittoria, created c. 1583. It is now in the Art Institute of Chicago. Produced using the lost wax method, it was commissioned by Hans Fugger for his family chapel at Schloss Kirchheim in Swabia. It remained in the Fugger family collection until 1908 and was bought by its present owner in 1942.
