= Piombino Dese =

- Comune
- Comune di Piombino Dese
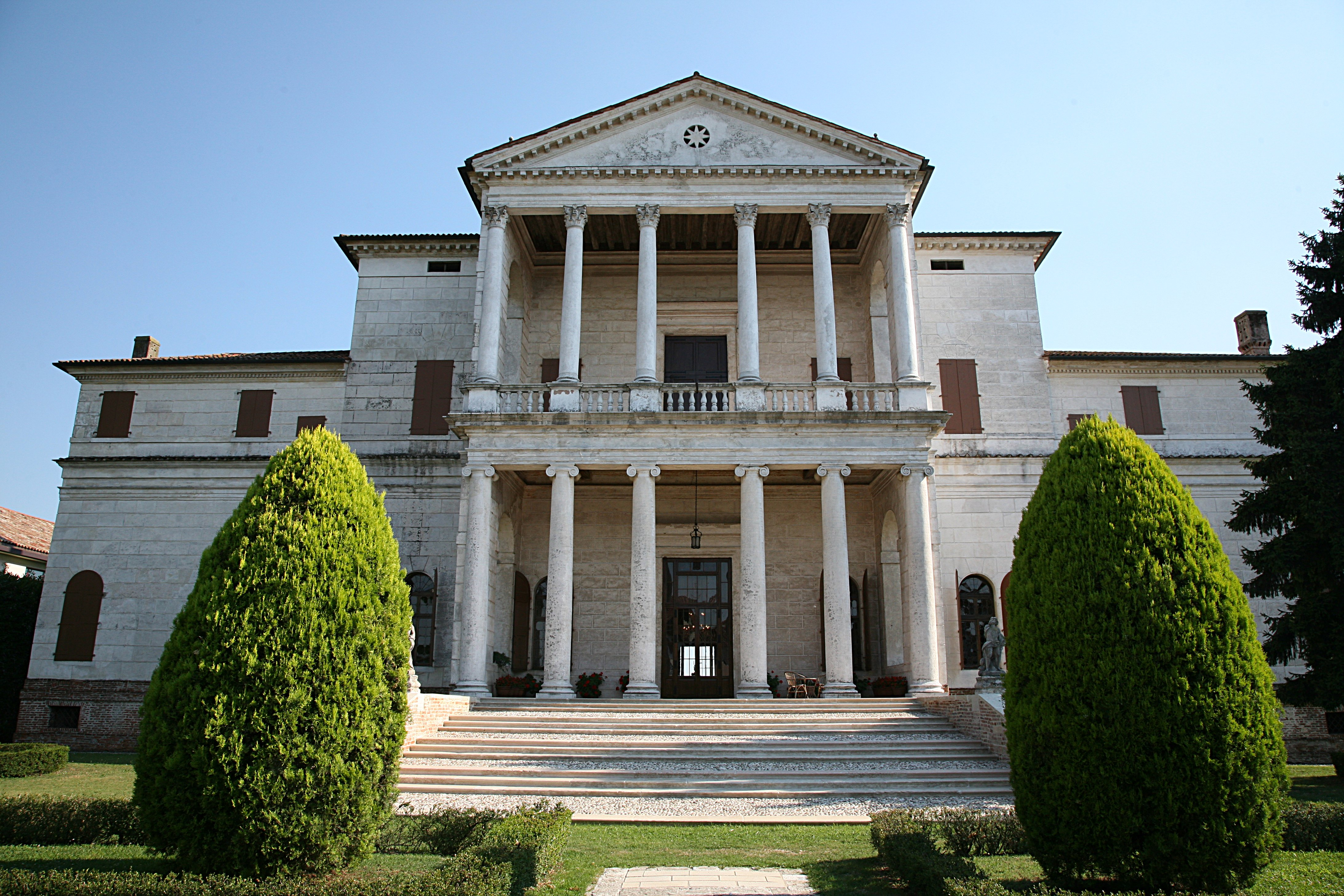
- Villa Cornaro.

- Location within Italy Location within Veneto
- Coordinates: 45°36′N 11°56′E
- Country: Italy
- Region: Veneto
- Province: Padua (PD)
- Frazioni: Levada, Torreselle, Ronchi

Government
  - Mayor: Cesare Mason

Area
  - Total: 29.5 km^{2} (11.4 sq mi)

Population (31 December 2105)
  - Total: 9,534
  - Density: 323/km^{2} (837/sq mi)
- Demonym: Piombinesi
- Time zone: UTC+1 (CET)
  - Summer (DST): UTC+2 (CEST)
- Postal code: 35017
- Dialing code: 049
- Patron saint: Saint Joseph
- Saint day: March 19
- Website: Official website

Piombino Dese is a comune (municipality) in the Province of Padua in the Italian region Veneto, located about 35 kilometres (22 mi) northwest of Venice and about 20 kilometres (12 mi) north of Padua.

Piombino Dese borders the following municipalities: Camposampiero, Istrana, Loreggia, Morgano, Resana, Trebaseleghe, Vedelago, Zero Branco.

Palladio's Villa Cornaro can be found in the comune's territory.
