= Centre For Electronics Design And Technology =

Indian research institute

Centre For Electronics Design And Technology (CEDT)
- Centre For Electronics Design And Technology Logo
- Type: Research Institution
- Established: 1974
- Chairman: Prof.L.Umanand
- Location: Bangalore, Karnataka, India
- Website: www.cedt.iisc.ernet.in

The Centre For Electronics Design And Technology or CEDT is one of the departments under the division of Electrical Sciences in Indian Institute of Science. It was established in 1974. In 2011, it was renamed as Department of Electronic Systems and Engineering (DESE).

== History ==
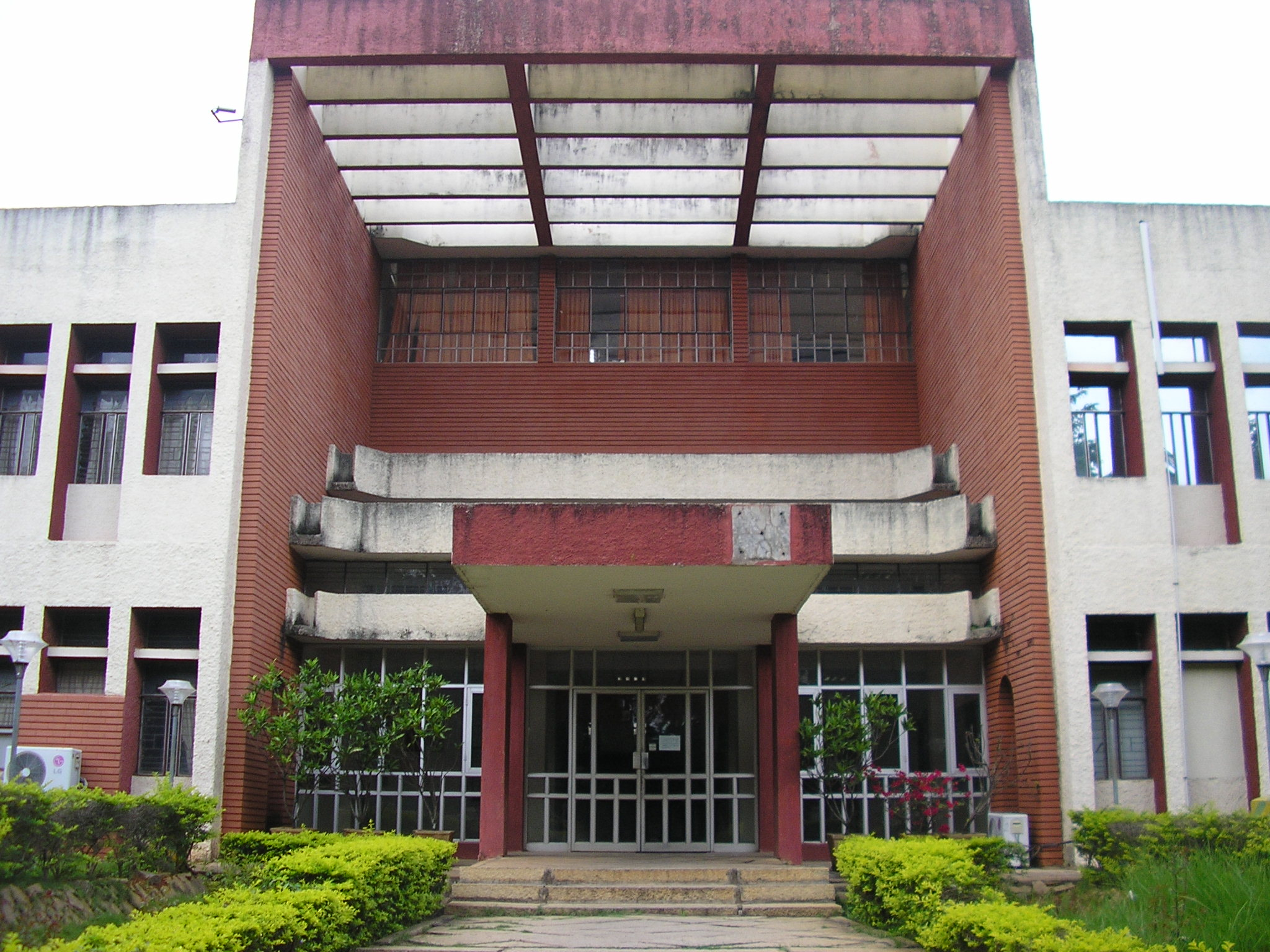
The main building of CEDT

CEDT was established in 1974 with the support from Indian and Swiss Governments under "Indo Swiss Agreement on Technical and Scientific Co-operation signed on 27th September 1966". Prof. Arvind Victor Shah and Prof. BS Sonde were the founding chairs. :. Now it is renamed as DESE, Department of Electronic System Engineering.

== Academics ==
The center offers following Master level programs, apart from the research program leading to a PhD.

1. Master in Technology (M.Tech.) in Electronics Design & Technology (EDT)
2. Master in Engineering (M.E.) in Microelectronics
3. Master of Science (M.Sc.Eng.)

== Admission ==
M.Tech.: candidates are shortlisted based on the GATE score. Then the admission is based on the written test & the interview conducted by CEDT faculty.

M.Sc. (By Research): candidates are shortlisted based on the GATE score. Then the admission is based on the interview conducted by CEDT faculty. The interview is conducted according to the candidates' area of interest.

== Research ==
1. Power Electronics
2. Communication Networks
3. Very Large Scale Integration (VLSI) Circuits & Systems
4. Nanoelectronics
5. Electronics Packaging
6. Electromagnetic Compatibility
7. Embedded Systems
8. Electro-Mechanics Lab

== Location ==
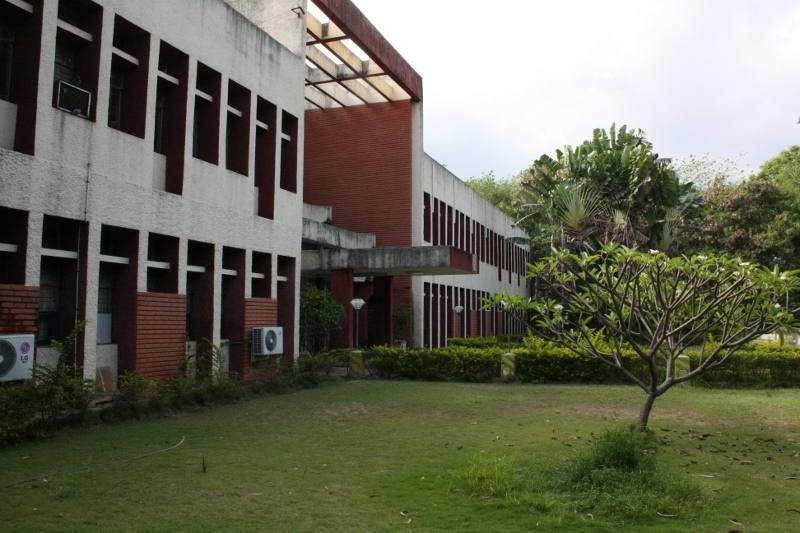
The lawn in front of CEDT building

CEDT is located in the eastern part of the IISc campus behind Mathematics department. The other nearby departments are:

1. Combustion, Gasification and Propulsion Laboratory
2. Center for Oceanic & Atmospheric Sciences

== Product design ==
The course structure is designed to inculcate system level understanding among the students. Most of the M.Tech. projects are sponsored by companies and result in hardware electronic products. Some of the students later transform their knowledge into commercial ventures like Gamma Porite.

== CEDT Design Expo ==
The CEDT Design Expo is the design exposition organised by the center every year in the month of June. In the expo, the M.Tech. students display the product designed by them as part of the two-year master's program. The display normally has a live demonstration of the product followed by discussions. The event is attended by various experts from the industry. The event is open to all.
