= St. Mark's Square =

St. Mark's Square can refer to:

- Piazza San Marco, the central square of Venice, Italy
- Piazza San Marco, Florence, a square in Florence, Italy
- St. Mark's Square, Zagreb, a major square in Zagreb, Croatia
- St. Mark's Square in the south of Lincoln, England

== See also ==
- St. Mark's (disambiguation)
