= St. Mark's =

St. Mark's may refer to:

== Places of worship ==
- St Mark's Basilica, Venice, Italy
- Saint Mark's Cathedral (disambiguation)
- St. Mark's Chapel (disambiguation)
- St. Mark's Church (disambiguation)
- Saint Mark's Coptic Orthodox Church (disambiguation)
- St. Mark's Episcopal Church (disambiguation)
- St. Mark's Episcopal Cathedral (disambiguation)

== Places ==
Croatia

- St. Mark's Square, Zagreb

Italy

- Piazza San Marco (St Mark's Square), Venice
  - St Mark's Basilica, Venice
- St Mark's English Church, Florence, an Anglican church

Malta

- Saint Mark's Tower

South Africa

- St Mark's, Eastern Cape

United Kingdom

- St Marks, Leicester, a residential suburb of Leicester, England
- St Mark's and Seething Wells (ward), electoral division in London, England

United States

- St. Marks, Florida, a small city
- Saint Marks, Georgia, an unincorporated community
- Saint Marks, Indiana, an unincorporated community
- 8th Street and St. Mark's Place, a street in the East Village in Manhattan, New York City
- St. Marks River, a river in Florida

== Educational institutions ==
- St Mark's Academy, London, England
- St. Mark's College (University of Adelaide), Adelaide, Australia
- St. Mark's College, Vancouver, at the University of British Columbia, Canada
- St Mark's College, Jane Furse, Limpopo Province, South Africa
- St. Mark's School (disambiguation)
- St Mark's Anglican Community School, Perth, Western Australia
- St Mark's National Theological Centre, Canberra, Australia

== Other ==
- St. Mark's Comics, a retailer located in New York City
- St Marks GAA, a Gaelic Athletic Association in South Dublin County, Ireland

== See also ==
- St. Mark's Square (disambiguation)
- Saint Mark (disambiguation)
