= St. Mark's Chapel =

St. Mark's Chapel may refer to:

- St. Mark's Episcopal Chapel (Annandale, Minnesota), listed on the NRHP in Minnesota
- St. Mark's Chapel (Raleigh, North Carolina), a former church that is a contributing property in a historic district in North Carolina
- St. Mark's Chapel, Vancouver, British Columbia, Canada
- St. Nicholas of Myra Church (Manhattan), built as the Memorial Chapel of St. Mark's Church in-the-Bowery

== See also ==
- St. Mark's (disambiguation)
- St. Mark's Church (disambiguation)
- St. Mark's Episcopal Church (disambiguation)
