= St. Mark's School =

St. Mark's School may refer to:

- St. Mark's School (Hong Kong), a coeducational school, grades F.1–F.6 (Equivalent of Grades 7–12), in the Eastern District of Hong Kong
- St. Mark's School (Massachusetts), a coeducational, Episcopal, preparatory school in Southborough, Massachusetts
- St Mark's School (Mbabane), a public coeducational school, grades 1–12 and A-Level (2 years), in Mbabane, Eswatini
- St. Mark's School of Texas, a nonsectarian preparatory day school for boys in Dallas, Texas
- St Mark's Catholic School, Hounslow, a secondary school in London, England
- St Mark's Church School, the only independent Anglican co-educational school in Wellington, New Zealand, for children aged from two (Early Childhood) to Year 8
- St Mark's Church of England School, Southampton, a coeducational school in Hampshire, England
- St Mark's Church of England Primary School, a coeducational school in Bournemouth, Dorset, England
- St. Mark's High School, a coeducational Roman Catholic high school in Wilmington, Delaware, United States
- St. Mark's Senior Secondary Public School, a coeducational English medium institution in West Delhi, India

== See also ==
- St. Mark's (disambiguation)
