= Piazza San Marco =

Square in Venice, Italy

St. Mark's Square
- Public square
- Piazza San Marco (Italian); Piasa San Marco (Venetian)
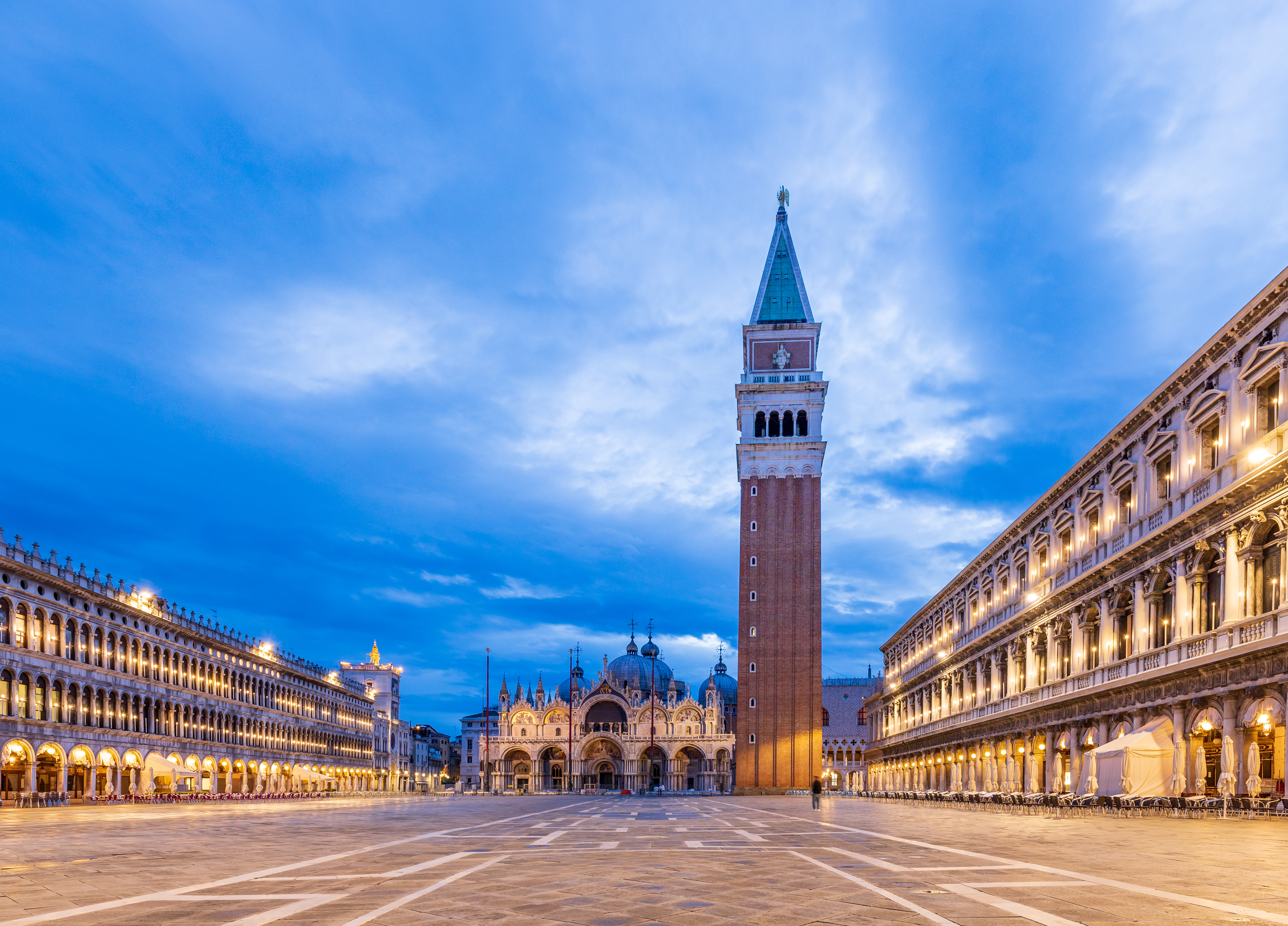
- Piazza San Marco in 2021
- Location: Venice, Italy
- Interactive map of St. Mark's Square
- Coordinates: 45°26′2″N 12°20′17″E

Piazza San Marco (Italian pronunciation: [ˈpjattsa sam ˈmarko]; Venetian: Piasa San Marco), often known in English as St Mark's Square, is the principal public square of Venice, Italy, where it is generally known just as la Piazza ("the Square"). The Piazzetta ("little Piazza/Square") is an extension of the Piazza towards San Marco basin in its southeast corner (see plan). The two spaces together form the social, religious and political centre of Venice and are referred to together. This article relates to both of them.

A remark usually attributed (though without proof) to Napoleon calls the Piazza San Marco "the drawing room of Europe".

== Description ==
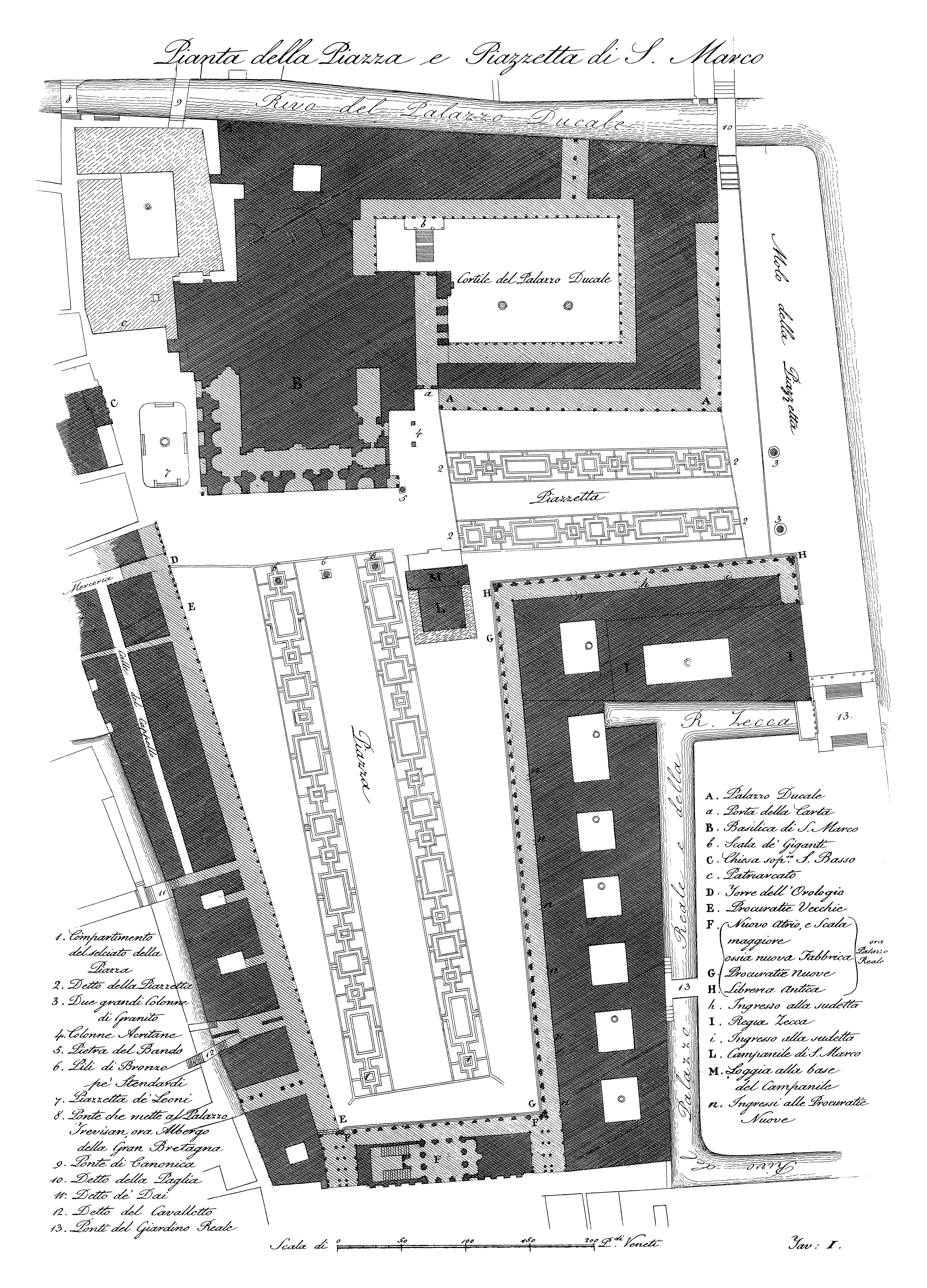
Plan of the Piazza and Piazzetta.

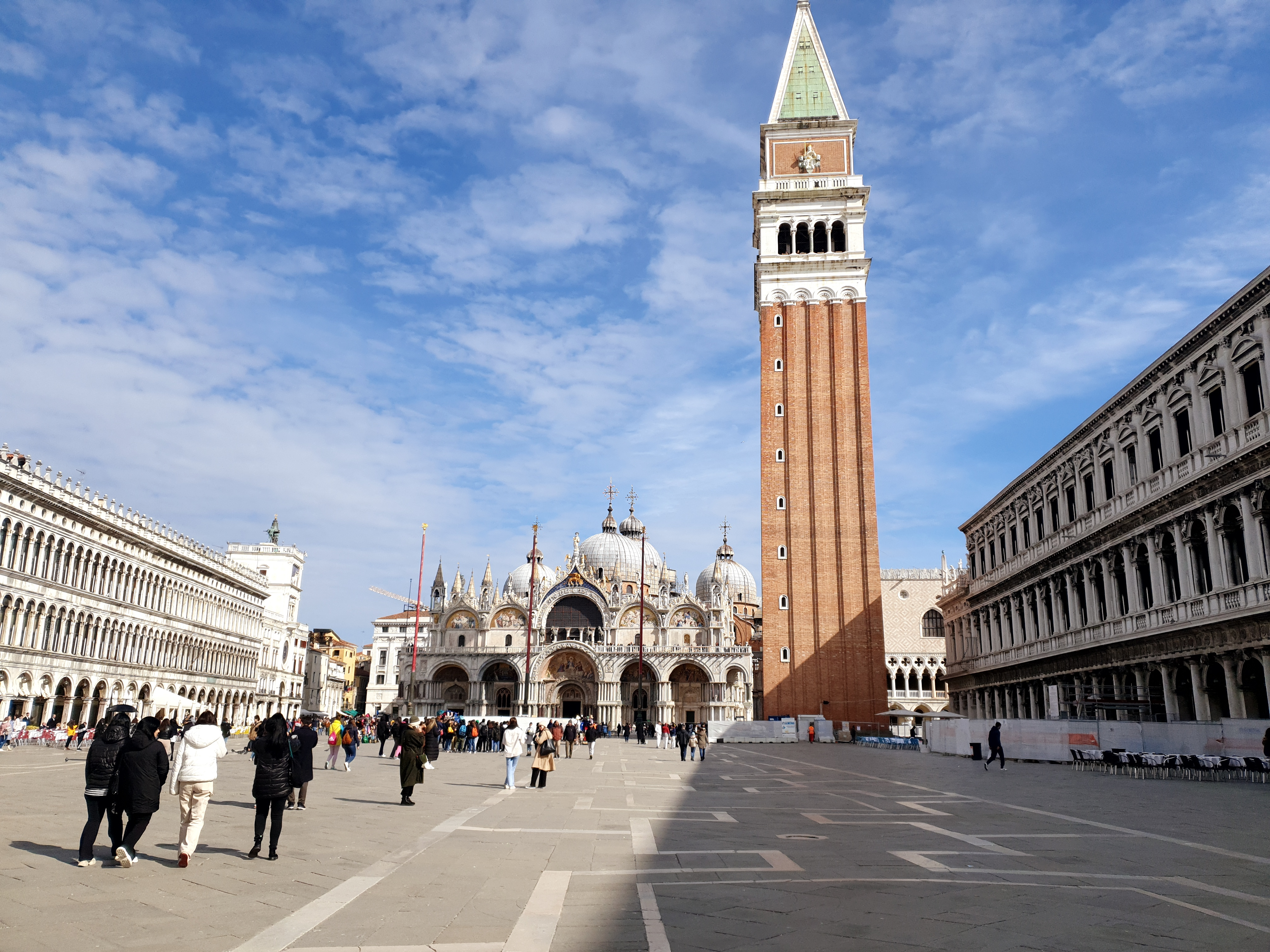
Piazza San Marco

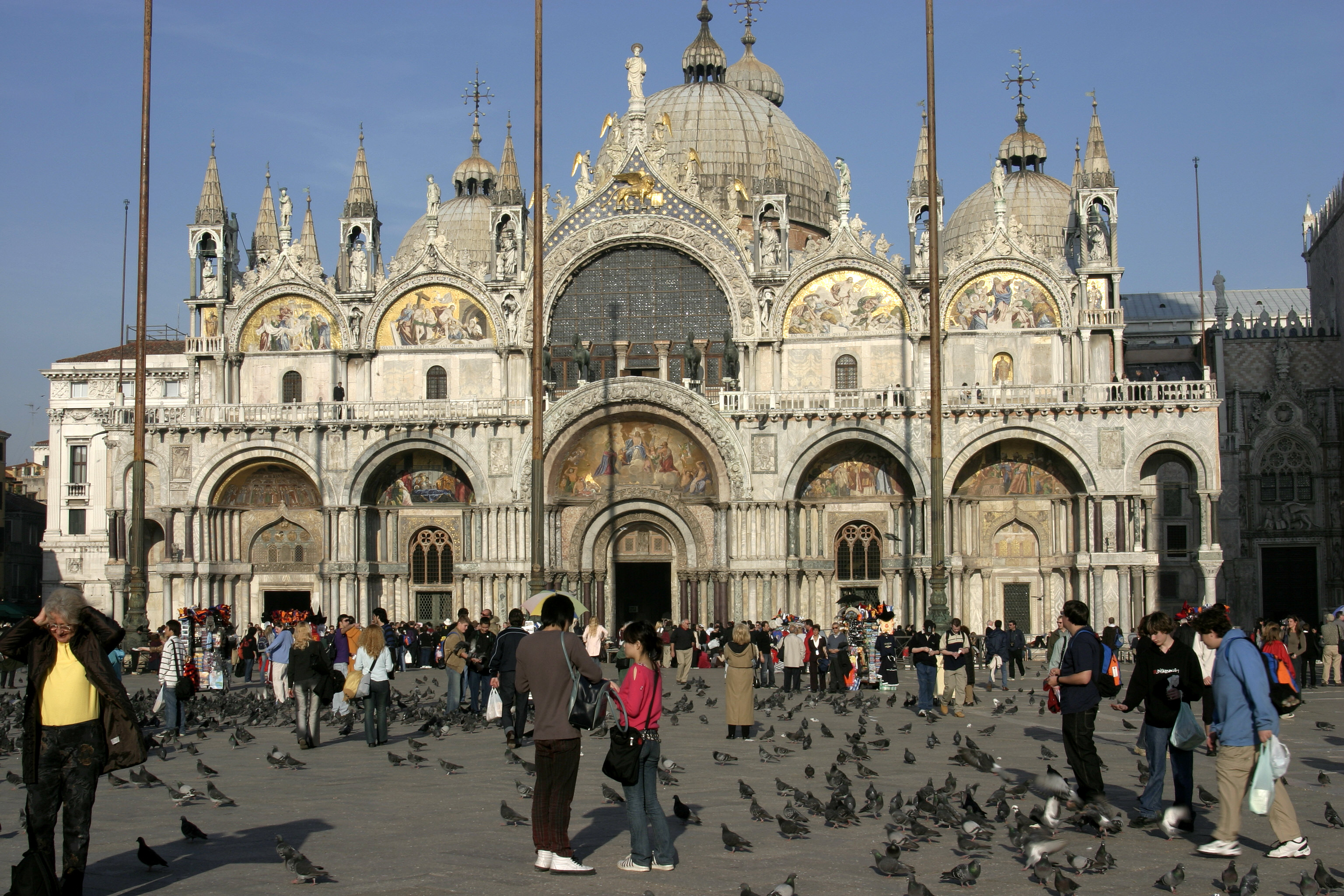
Western façade of St Mark's Basilica

The square is dominated at its eastern end by St Mark's Basilica. It is described here by a perambulation starting from the west front of the church (facing the length of the piazza) and proceeding to the right.

St Mark's Basilica has a western façade with great arches and marble decoration, Romanesque carvings around the central doorway, and four horses which preside over the whole piazza. The four horses are potent symbols of pride and power in Venice. In 1379, the Genoese said there could be no peace between the two cities until these horses had been bridled. Four hundred years later, Napoleon, after he had conquered Venice, had them taken down and shipped to Paris.

The Piazzetta dei Leoncini is an open space on the north side of the church named after the two marble lions (presented by Doge Alvise Mocenigo in 1722), but now officially called the Piazzetta San Giovanni XXIII. The neo-classic building on the east side adjoining the Basilica is the Palazzo Patriarcale, the seat of the Patriarch of Venice.

Beyond that is St Mark's Clocktower (Torre dell'Orologio), completed in 1499, above a high archway where the street known as the Merceria (a main thoroughfare of the city) leads through shopping streets to the Rialto, the commercial and financial centre. To the right of the clock-tower is the closed church of San Basso, designed by Baldassarre Longhena (1675), sometimes open for exhibitions.

To the left is the long arcade along the north side of the piazza, the buildings on this side are known as the Procuratie Vecchie, the old procuracies, formerly the homes and offices of the Procurators of St Mark, high officers of state in the days of the republic of Venice. They were built in the early 16th century. The arcade is lined with shops and restaurants at ground level, with offices above. The restaurants include the famous Caffè Quadri, which was patronized by the Austrians when Venice was ruled by Austria in the 19th century, while the Venetians preferred Florian's on the other side of the piazza.

Turning left at the end, the arcade continues along the west end of the piazza, which was rebuilt by Napoleon about 1810 and is known as the Ala Napoleonica (Napoleonic Wing). It holds, behind the shops, a ceremonial staircase which was to have led to a royal palace but now forms the entrance to the Museo Correr (Correr Museum).

Turning left again, the arcade continues down the south side of the Piazza. The buildings on this side are known as the Procuratie Nuove (new procuracies), which were designed by Jacopo Sansovino in the mid-16th century but partly built (1582–86) after his death by Vincenzo Scamozzi apparently with alterations required by the procurators and finally completed by Baldassarre Longhena about 1640. Again, the ground floor has shops and also the Caffè Florian, a famous cafe opened in 1720 by Floriano Francesconi, which was patronised by the Venetians when the hated Austrians were at Quadri's. The upper floors were intended by Napoleon to be a palace for his stepson Eugène de Beauharnais, his viceroy in Venice, and now houses the Museo Correr. At the far end the Procuratie meet the north end of Sansovino's Libreria (mid-16th century), whose main front faces the piazzetta and is described there. The arcade continues round the corner into the Piazzetta.

Opposite to this, standing free in the piazza, is St Mark's Campanile (1156–73 last restored in 1514), rebuilt in 1912 com'era, dov'era ("as it was, where it was") after the collapse of the former campanile on 14 July 1902. Adjacent to the campanile, facing towards the church, is the small building known as the Loggetta del Sansovino, built by Sansovino in 1537–46 and used as a lobby by patricians waiting to go into a meeting of the Great Council in the Doge's Palace and by guards when the council was sitting.

Across the piazza in front of the church are three large mast-like flagpoles with bronze bases decorated in high relief by Alessandro Leopardi in 1505. The Venetian flag of St Mark used to fly from them in the time of the republic of Venice and now shares them with the Italian flag.

In the Piazza San Marco

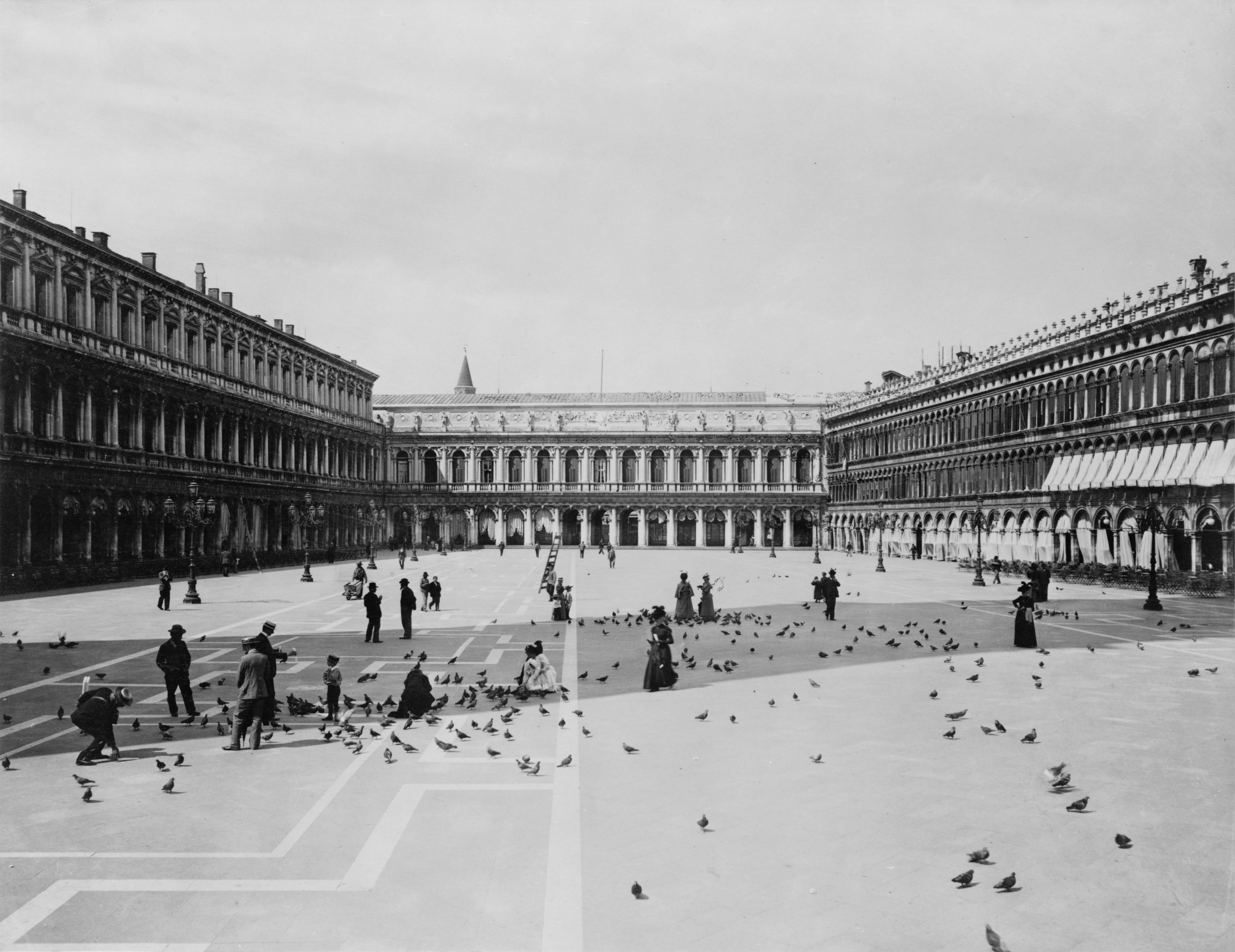
Procuratie Vecchie and Procuratie Nuove, 1890

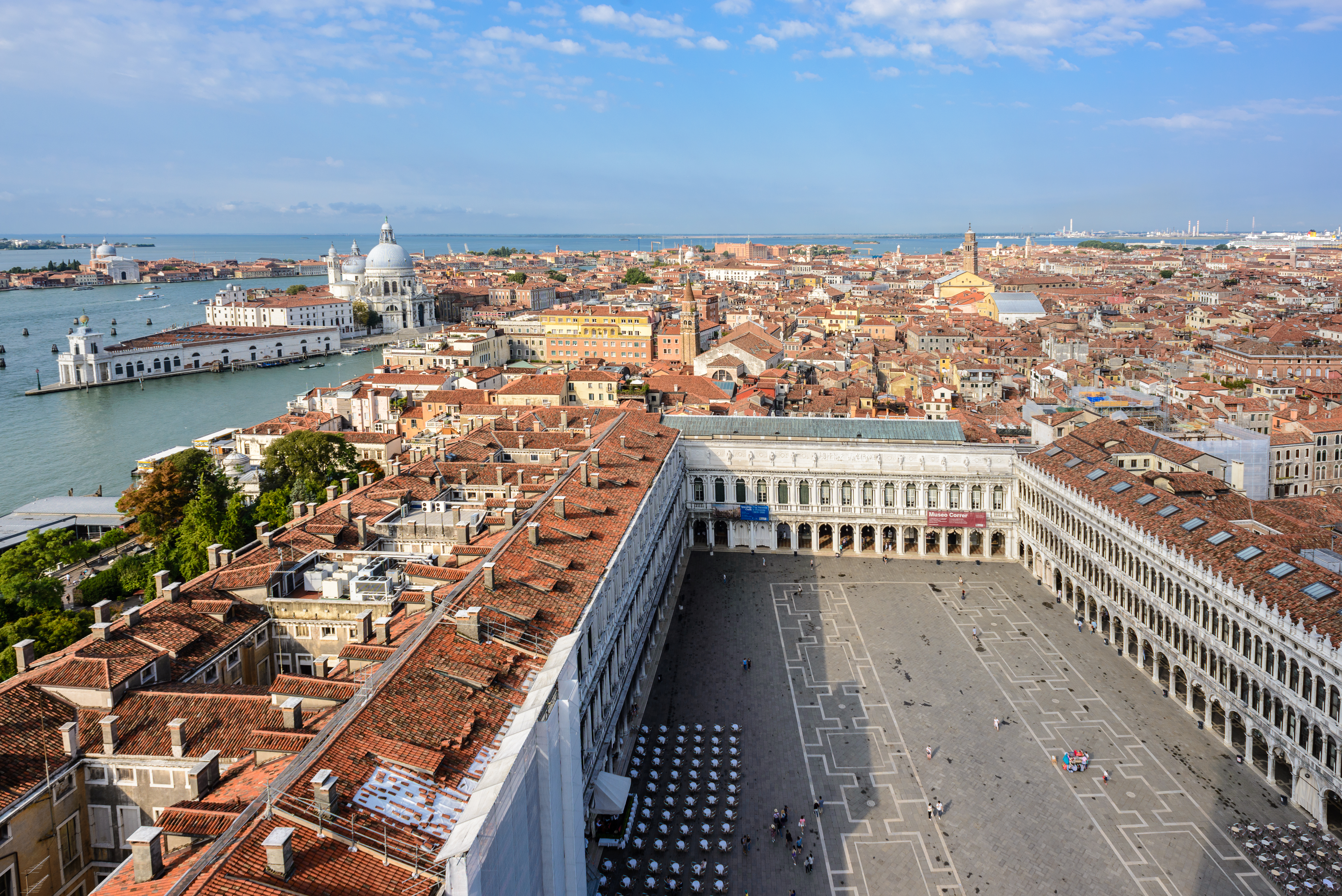
The Piazza seen from the Campanile

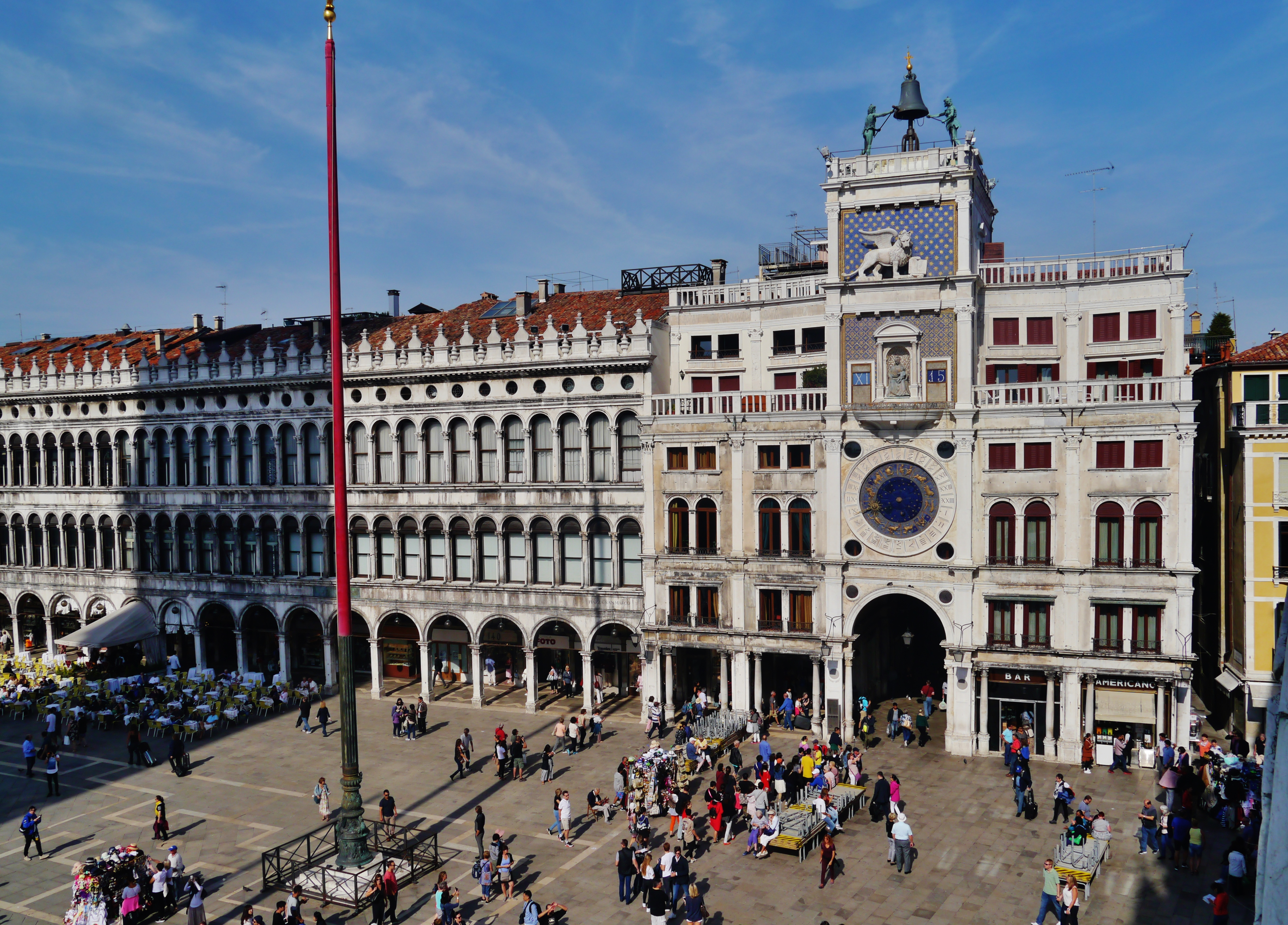
The Clocktower with the archway into the Mercerie leading to the Rialto

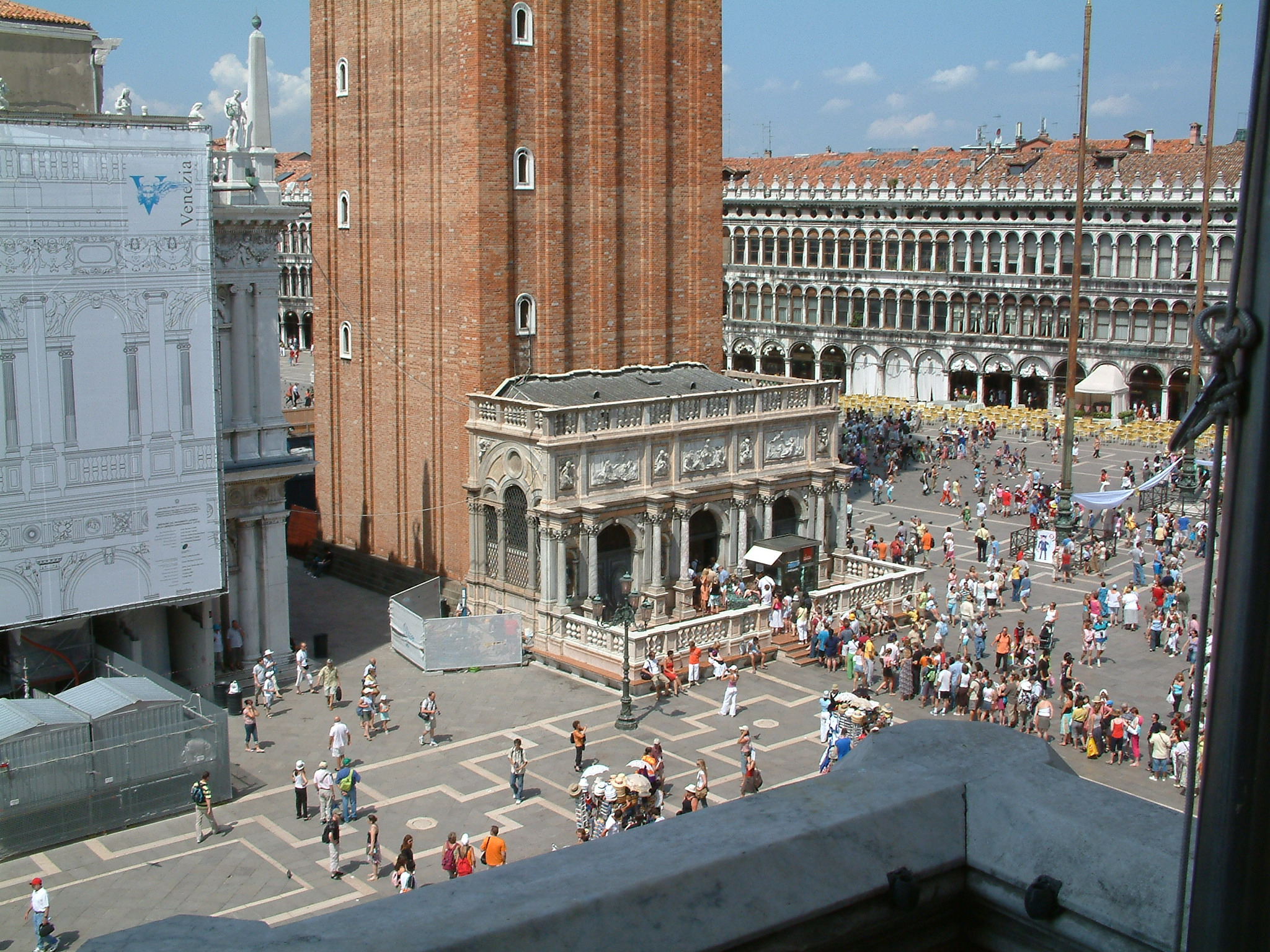
The Loggetta at the foot of the Campanile (built by Sansovino 1537–46); rebuilt after the fall of Campanile in 1902

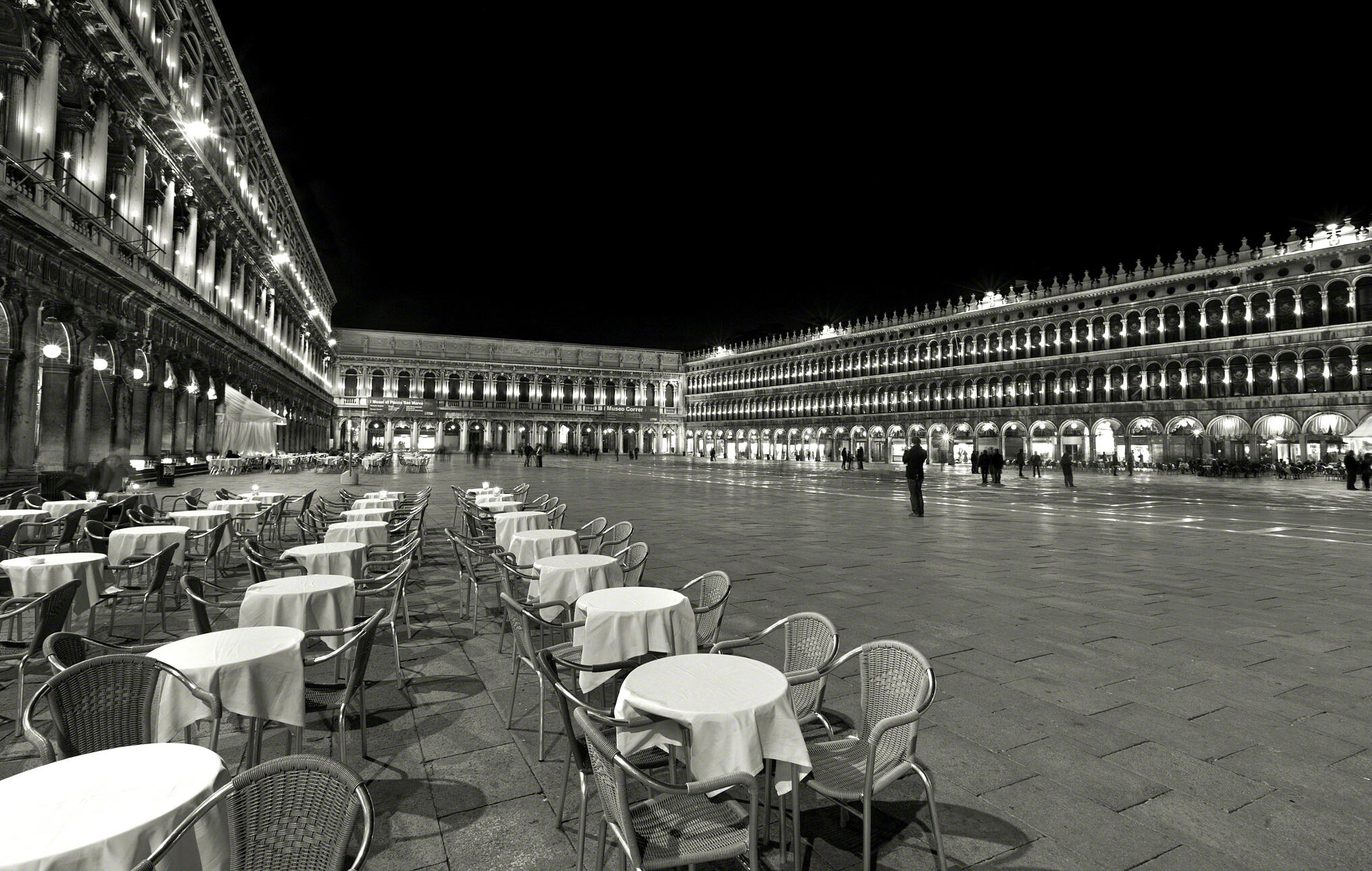
Piazza San Marco at night
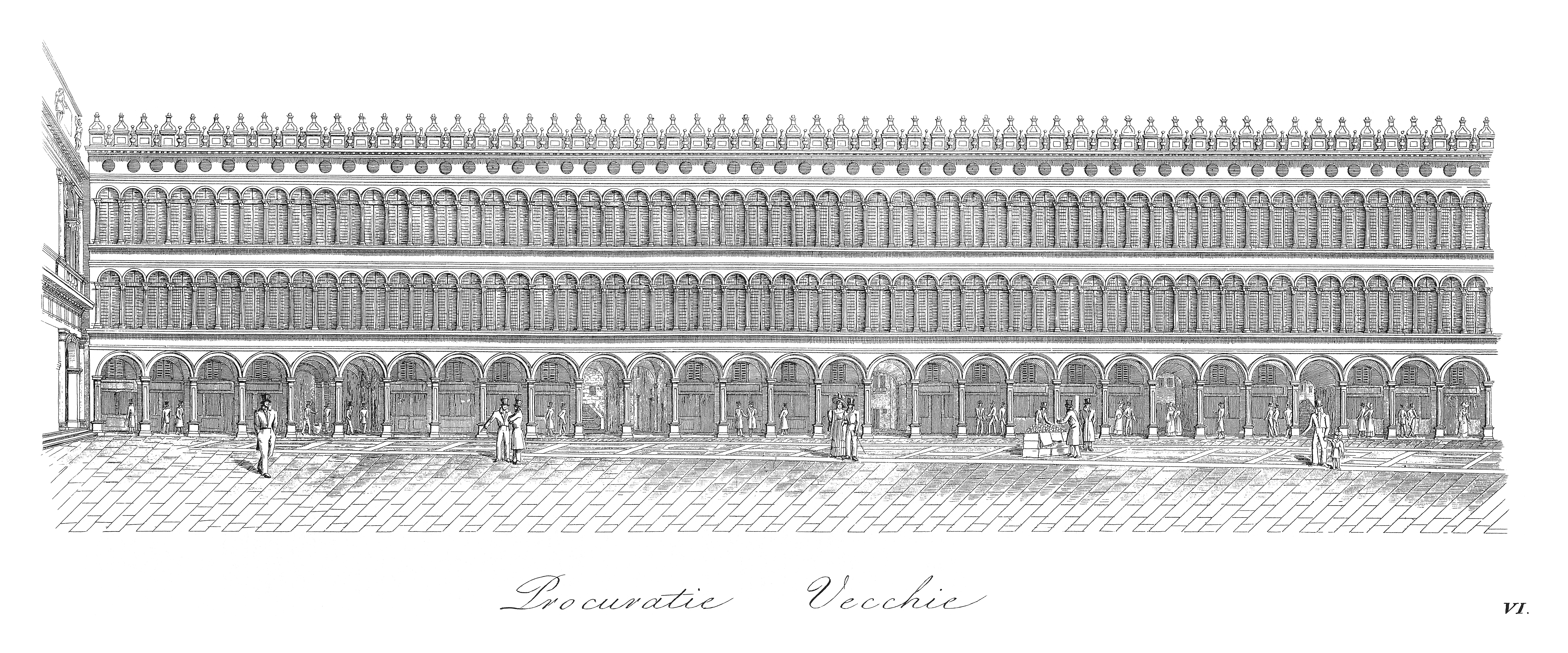
Elevation of the Procuratie Vecchie (c. 1520), print from Quadri-Moretti (1831)

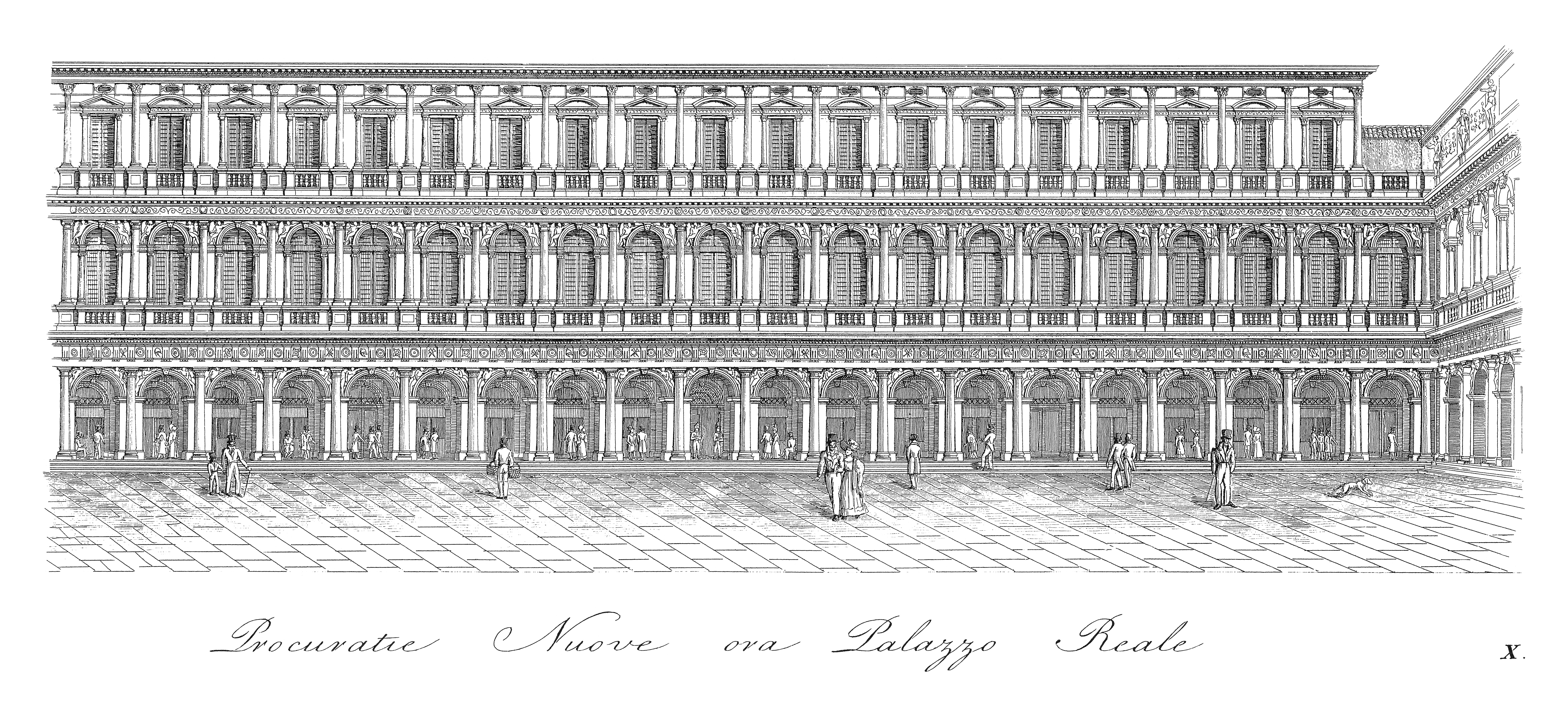
Elevation of the Procuratie Nuove (c. 1580), print from Quadri-Moretti (1831)

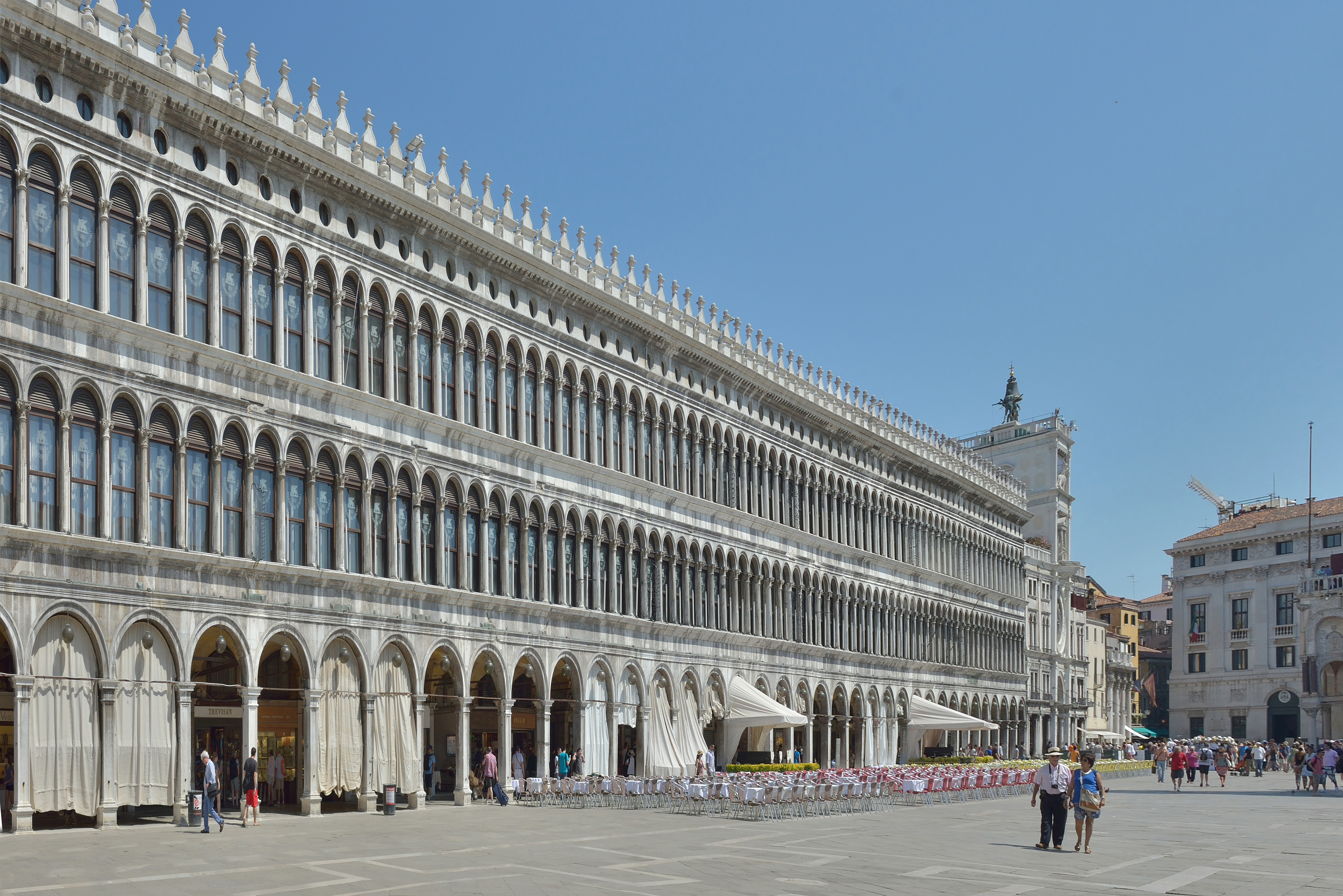
Procuratie Vecchie built by Bartolomeo Bon the Younger (c. 1520)

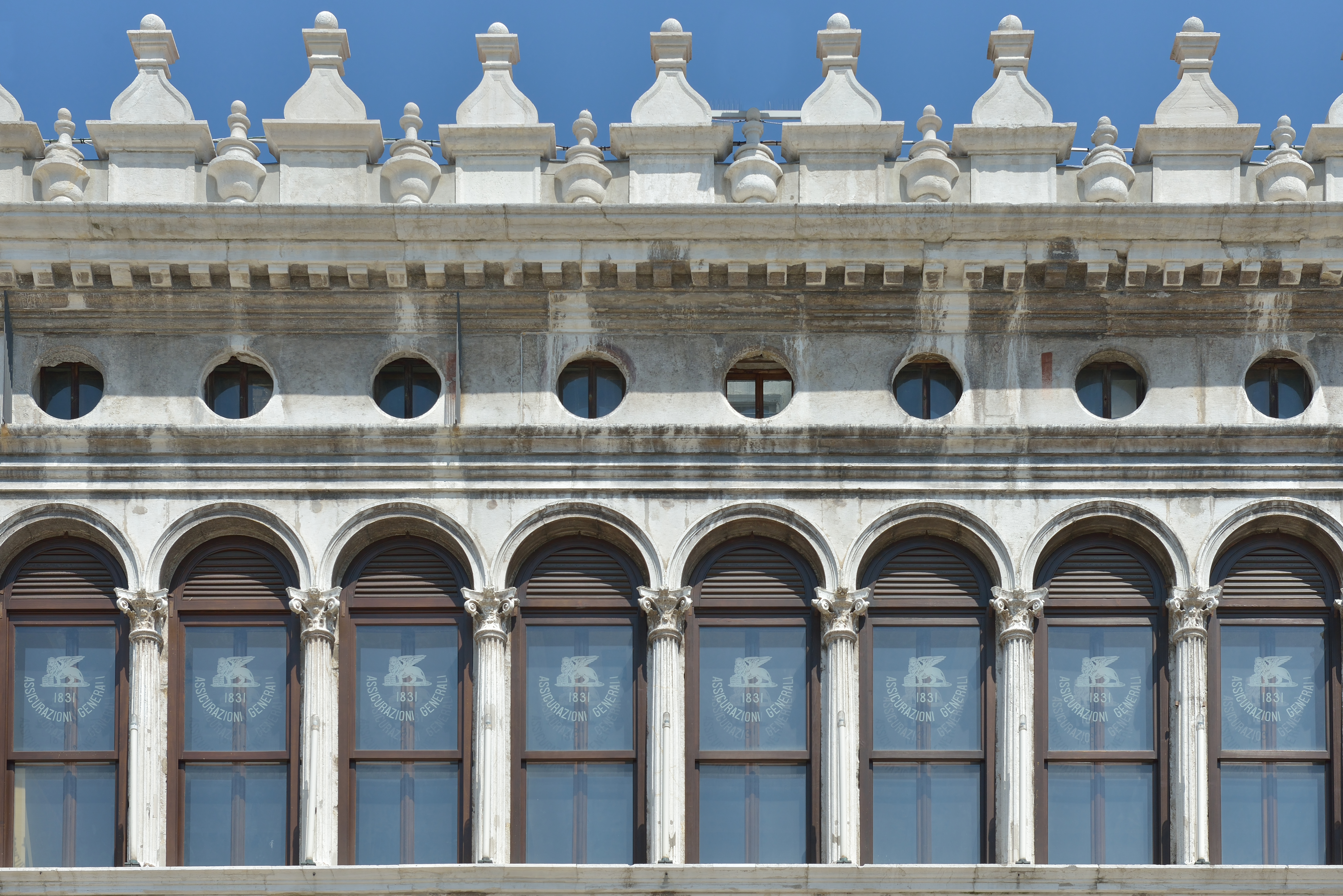
Detail of the windows of Procurate Vecchie

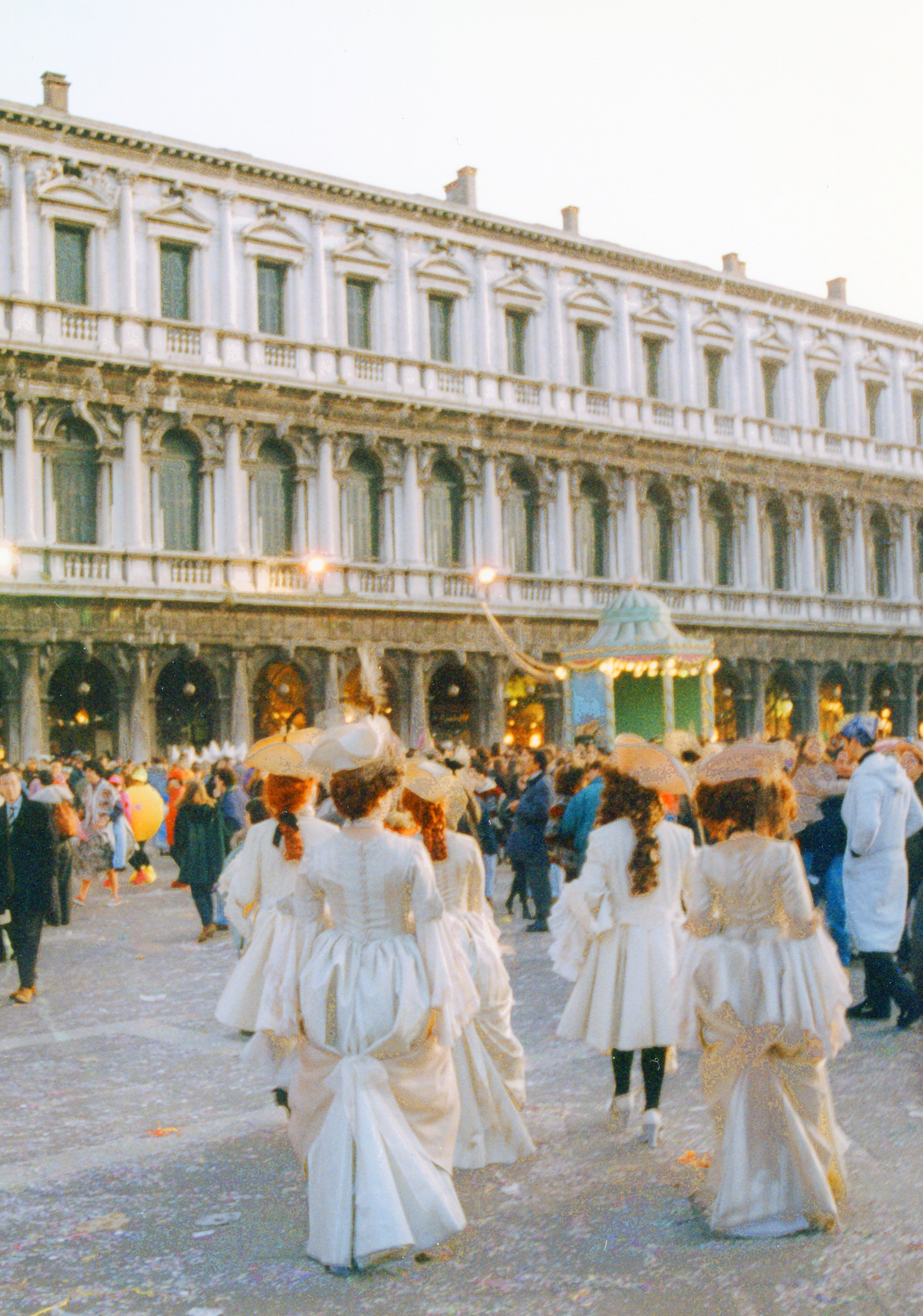
Procuratie Nuove built by Vincenzo Scamozzi (c. 1580) adapting a design by Sansovino (during Carnival 1993)

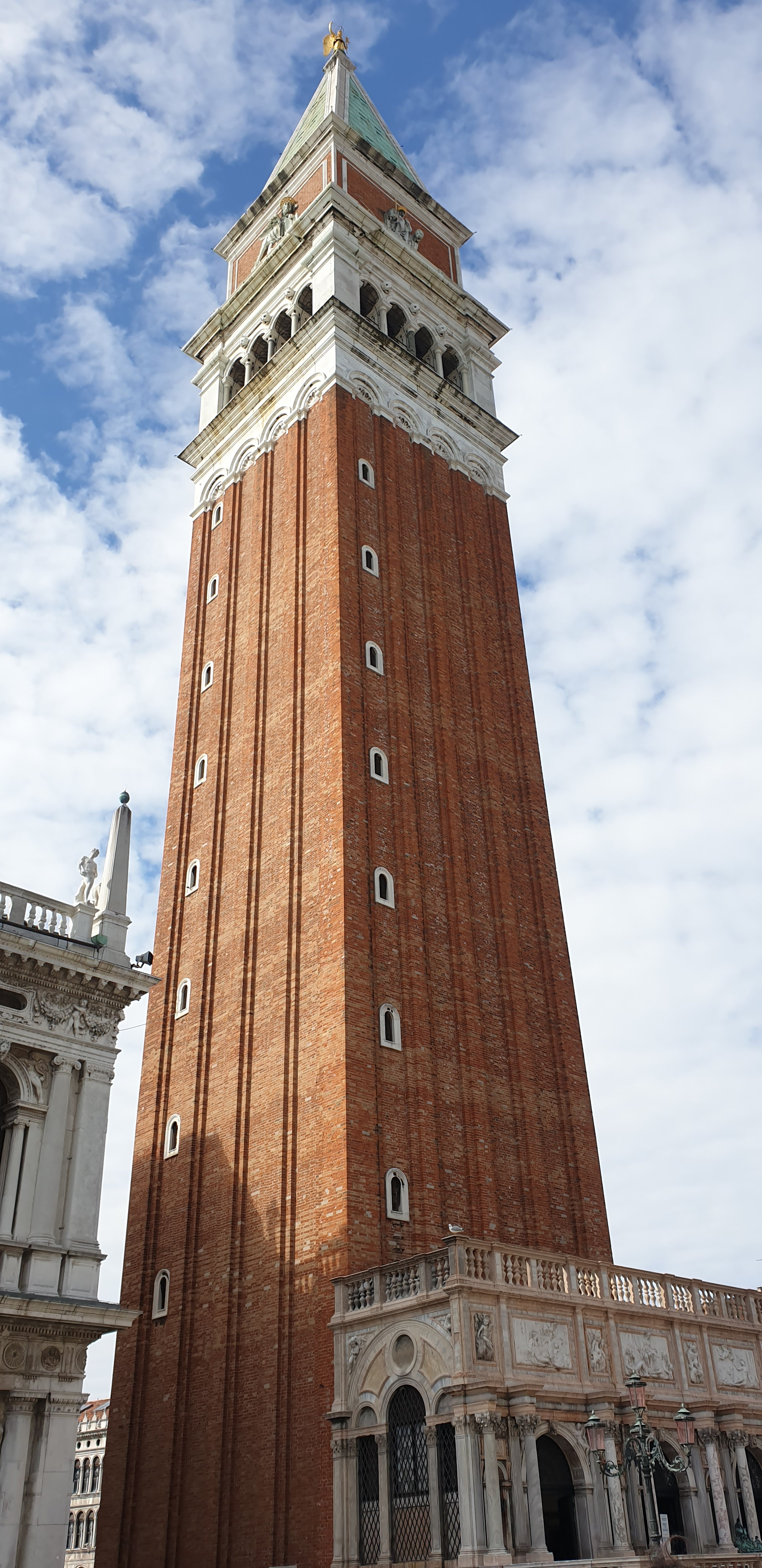
St Mark's Campanile (Campanile di San Marco)

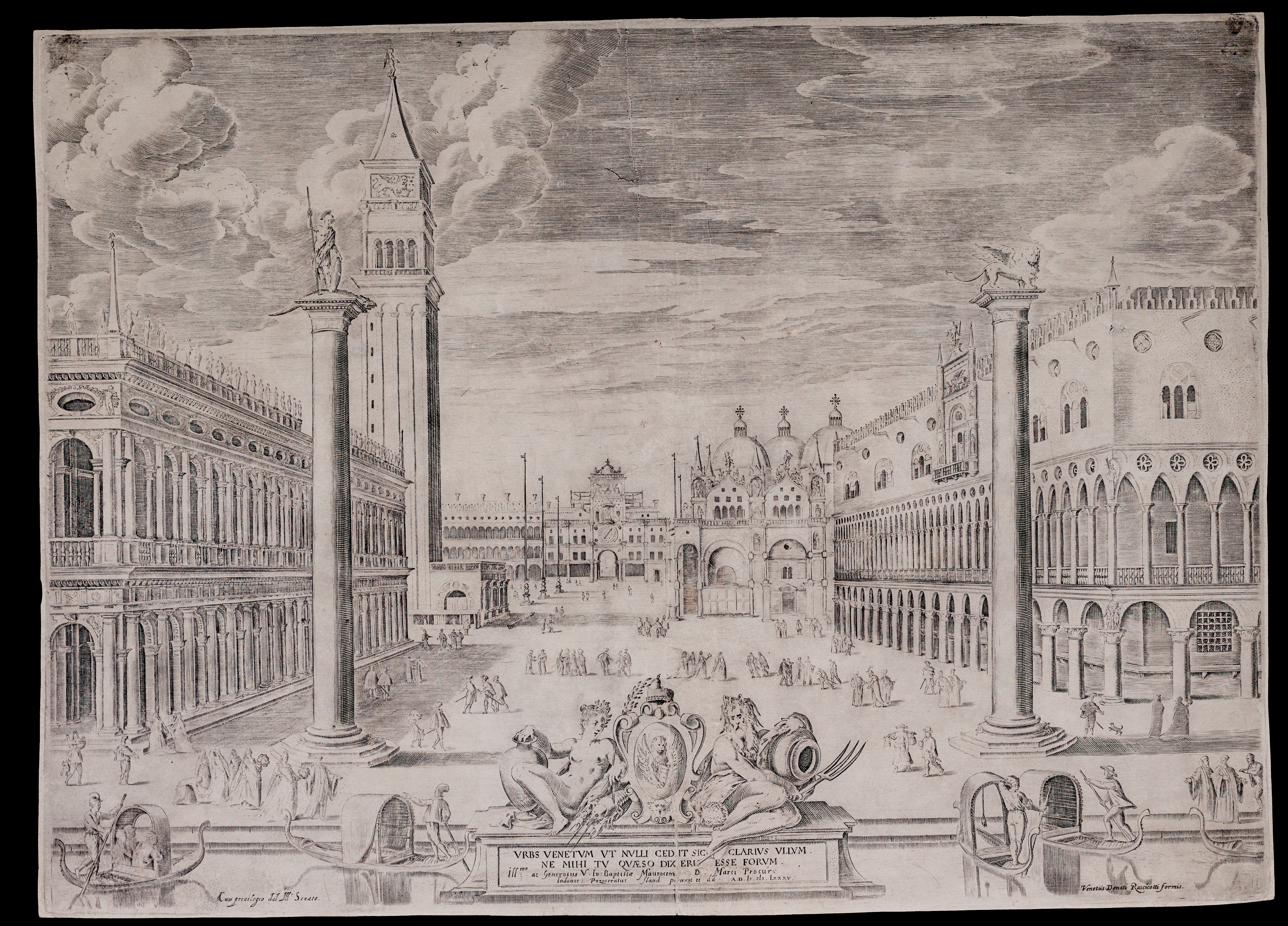
View from the Piazzetta (1585)

== Description of the Piazzetta ==
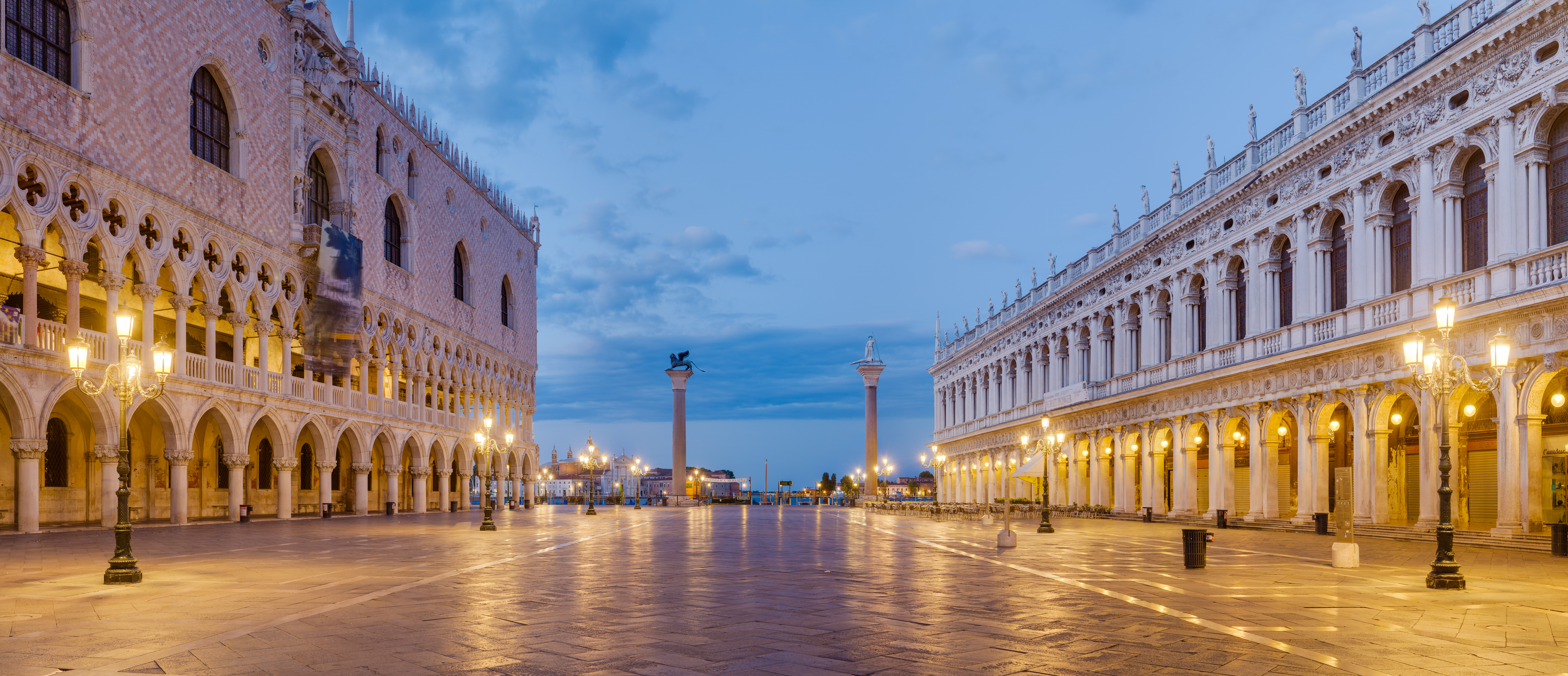
The Piazzetta San Marco seen from Saint Mark's Basilica

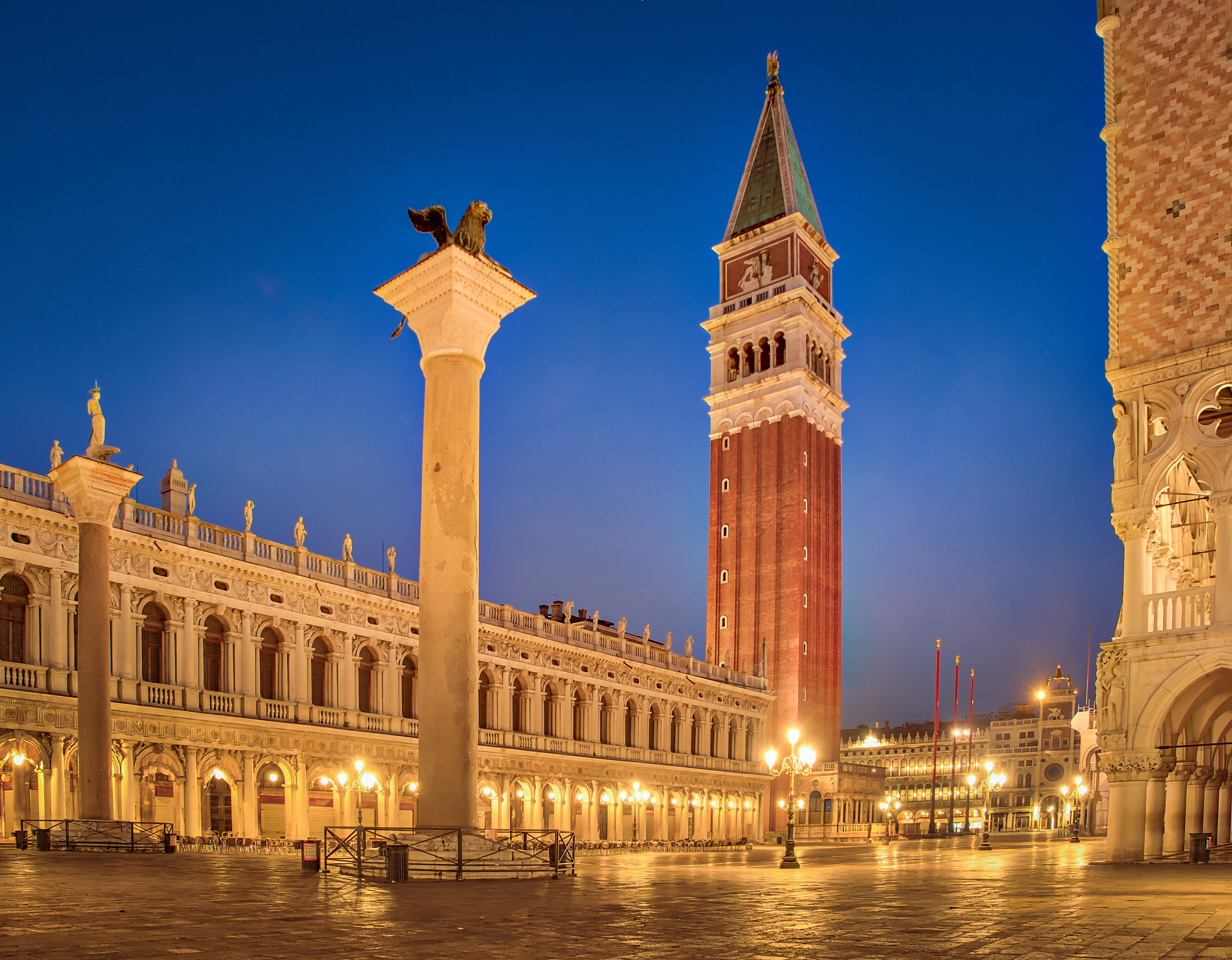
The Biblioteca Marciana designed by Sansovino and the two columns in the Piazzetta, seen from the lagoon

The Piazzetta di San Marco is, strictly speaking, not part of the Piazza but an adjoining open space connecting the south side of the Piazza to the waterway of the lagoon. The Piazzetta lies between the Doge's Palace on the east and Jacopo Sansovino's Biblioteca (Library) which holds the Biblioteca Marciana on the west.

At the corner near the campanile, this (west) side is occupied entirely by the Biblioteca (Library) designed by Jacopo Sansovino to hold the Biblioteca Marciana (library of St Mark). Building started in 1537 and it was extended, after the death of Sansovino, by Vincenzo Scamozzi in 1588–91. The building was said by Palladio to be "the most magnificent and ornate structure built since ancient times". The arcade continues to the end of the building with cafés and shops and also the entrances to the Archaeological Museum, the Biblioteca Marciana and the National Library, which occupy the floors above.

At the end of this building is the Molo (the quay fronting the lagoon) and the adjoining building to the right is the Zecca (mint) also by Sansovino (completed 1547) and now part of the Biblioteca Marciana. Turning to the left at the end of the Biblioteca one crosses the open end of the Piazzetta marked by two large granite columns carrying symbols of the two patron saints of Venice. The first is Saint Theodore, who was the patron of the city before St Mark, holding a spear and with a crocodile to represent the dragon which he was said to have slain. This is made up of parts of antique statues and is a copy (the original is kept in the Doge's Palace). The second (eastern) column has a creature representing a winged lion – the Lion of Venice – which is the symbol of St Mark. This has a long history, probably starting as a winged lion-griffin on a monument to the god Sandon at Tarsus in Cilicia (Southern Turkey) about 300 BC. The columns are now thought to have been erected about 1268, when the water was closer and they would have been on the edge of the lagoon, framing the entry to the city from the sea. Gambling was permitted in the space between the columns and this right was said to have been granted as a reward to the man who first raised the columns. Public executions also took place between the columns.

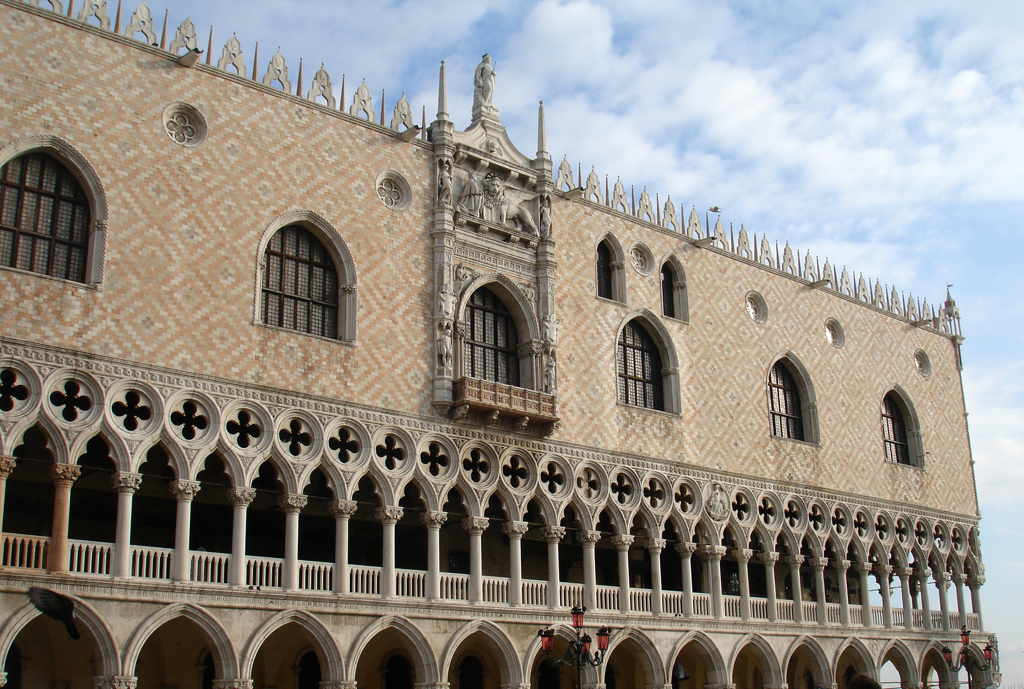
The column of the Piazzetta façade of the Doge's Palace marking the division between the 14th- and 15th-century structures

On the far side of the Piazzetta is the side wall of the Doge's Palace with Gothic arcades at ground level and a loggia on the floor above. Up to the seventh pillar from the front this is the building as rebuilt in 1340, while the extension towards the Basilica was added in 1424. The capitals of the columns of the extended part are mostly copies of those in the front of the Palace. The seventh pillar is marked by a tondo (circular sculpture) of Venice as Justice above the first floor loggia. To the left of this, there are two red pillars in front of the first-floor loggia, contrasting with the other pillars which are of white Istrian stone. The red pillars are made of red Verona marble. They may have framed the Doge's chair on ceremonial occasions, but it seems that important malefactors found guilty of crimes against the state would sometimes be executed there.

On the rear corner of the Doge's Palace is a sculpture of the Judgment of Solomon with the archangel Gabriel above. The sculptors are not known. Set back from this corner is the Porta della Carta, the ceremonial entrance to the palace, built in fine Gothic style in 1438–43, probably by Giovanni and Bartolomeo Bon. Again, there is at the top a figure of Venice as Justice, the theme of fair judgment and justice being much emphasised on this side of the palace. Below this, the head of Doge Francisco Foscari and the lion before which he is kneeling were replaced in 1885, the originals having been destroyed on French orders in 1797. The statues on either side of the gateway represent the cardinal virtues of Temperance, Fortitude, Prudence and Charity.

Next to this, on an outside corner of the basilica of St Mark, are four antique figures carved in porphyry, a very hard red granite. They are usually known as the Tetrarchs and said to represent the four joint rulers of the Roman Empire appointed by Diocletian and were formerly thought to be Egyptian. It is now thought probable (or, at least very possible) that they represent the sons of the Emperor Constantine, praised for their loving co-operation on his death in 337, especially as the work originally stood in the Philadelphion (Place of Brotherly Love) in Constantinople, where the missing foot of one of the figures has been found.

Beyond this, in front of the South wall of the Basilica are two rectangular pillars always known as the Pillars of Acre. They were thought to be booty taken by the Venetians from Acre after their great victory over the Genoese there in 1258, but this traditional story has also had to be revised. The pillars actually came from the church of St Polyeuktos in Constantinople (524–27), and were probably taken by the Venetians soon after the fourth crusade in 1204. The ruins of this church were discovered in 1960 and it was excavated in the 1990s, when capitals were found, which matched the pillars.

Beyond these pillars, opposite the corner of the Basilica, is a great circular stone of red porphyry known as the Pietra del Bando (Proclamation Stone) from which official proclamations used to be read. It has been suggested that this may have formed part of a column on which the so-called Tetrarchs stood.

Across the water (the Bacino di San Marco) at the end of the Piazzetta can be seen the island of San Giorgio Maggiore and the white façade of Palladio's church there.

Buildings and monuments in the Piazzetta

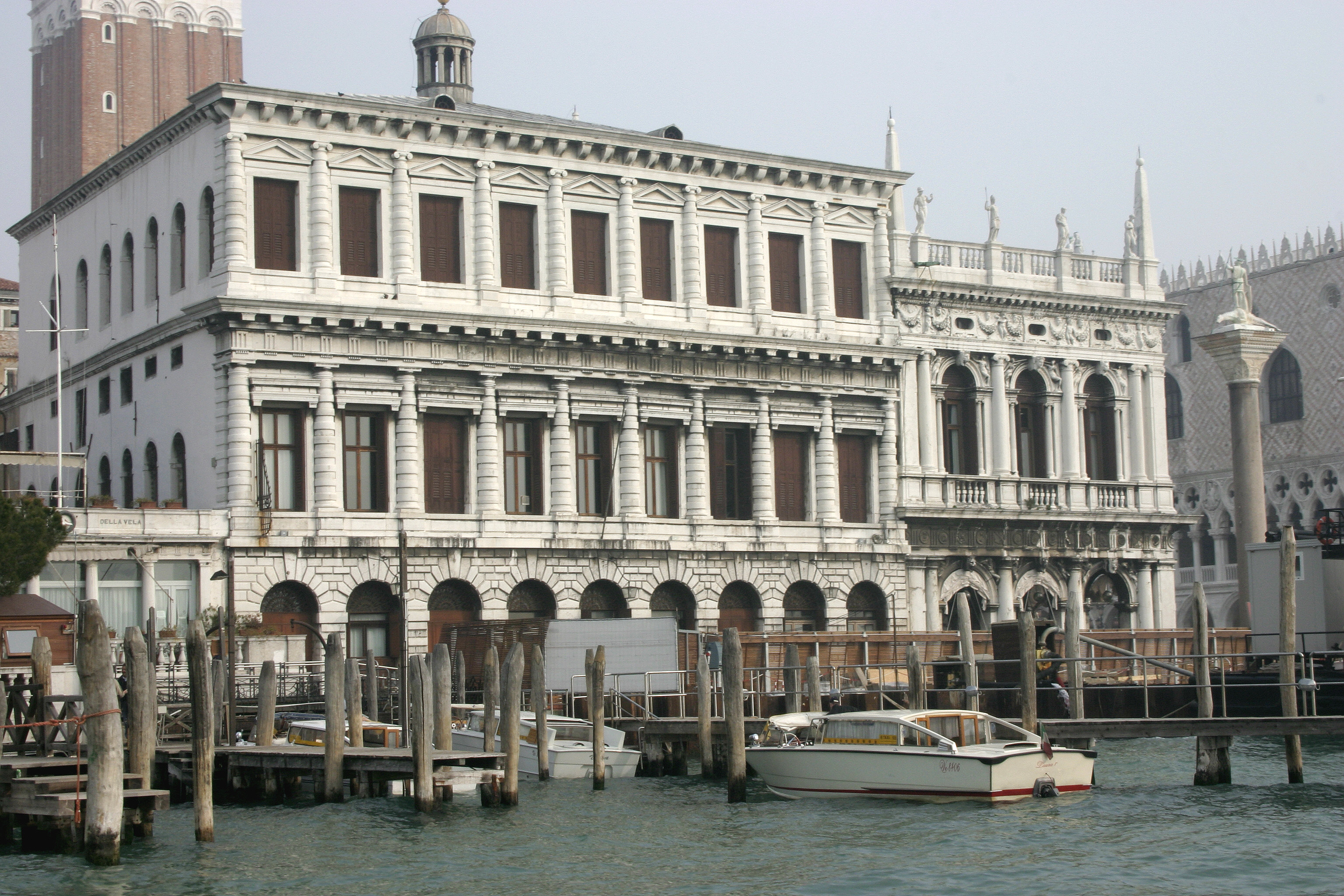
The Zecca and the south end of the Biblioteca from the lagoon

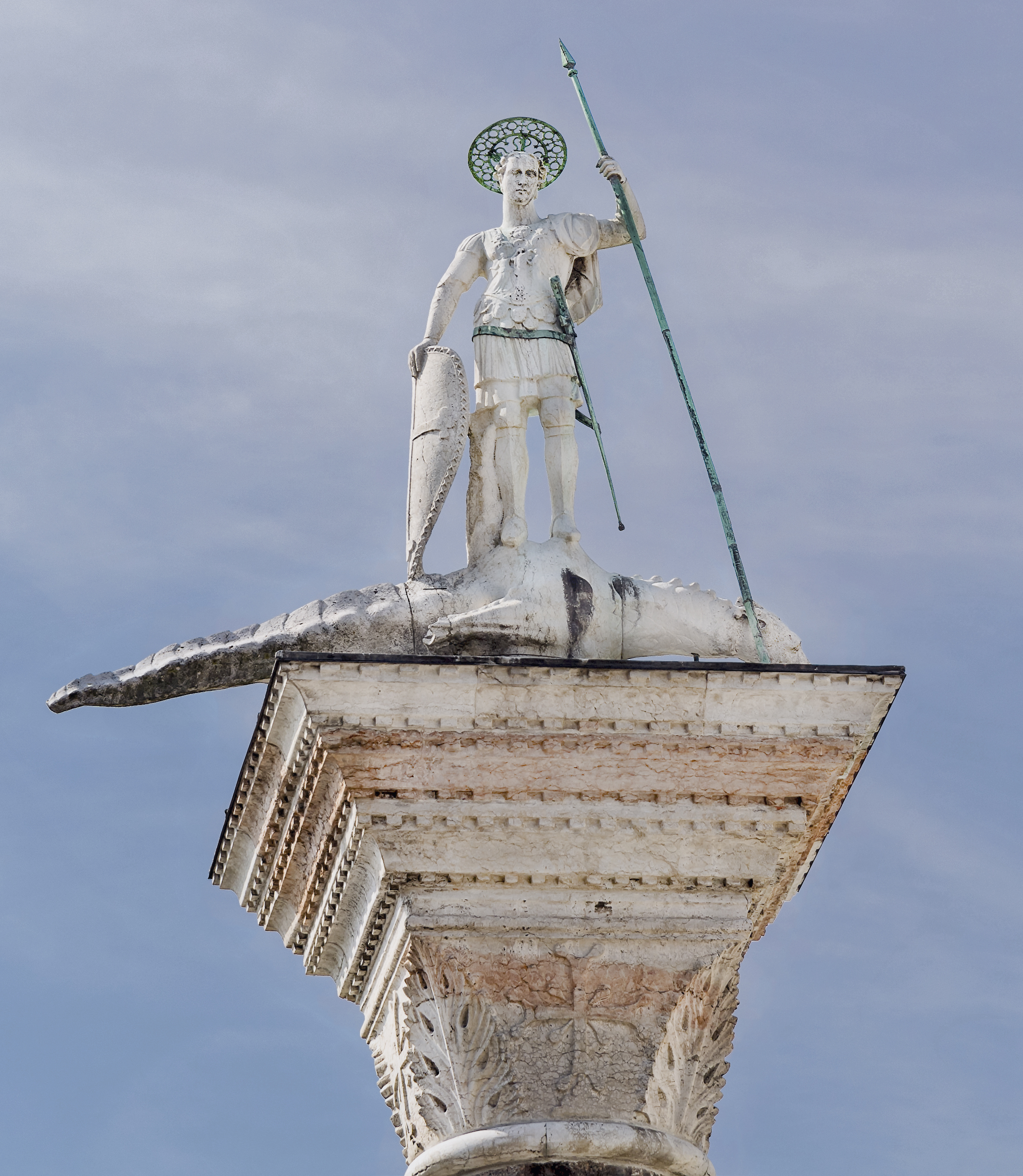
St Theodore on the western column

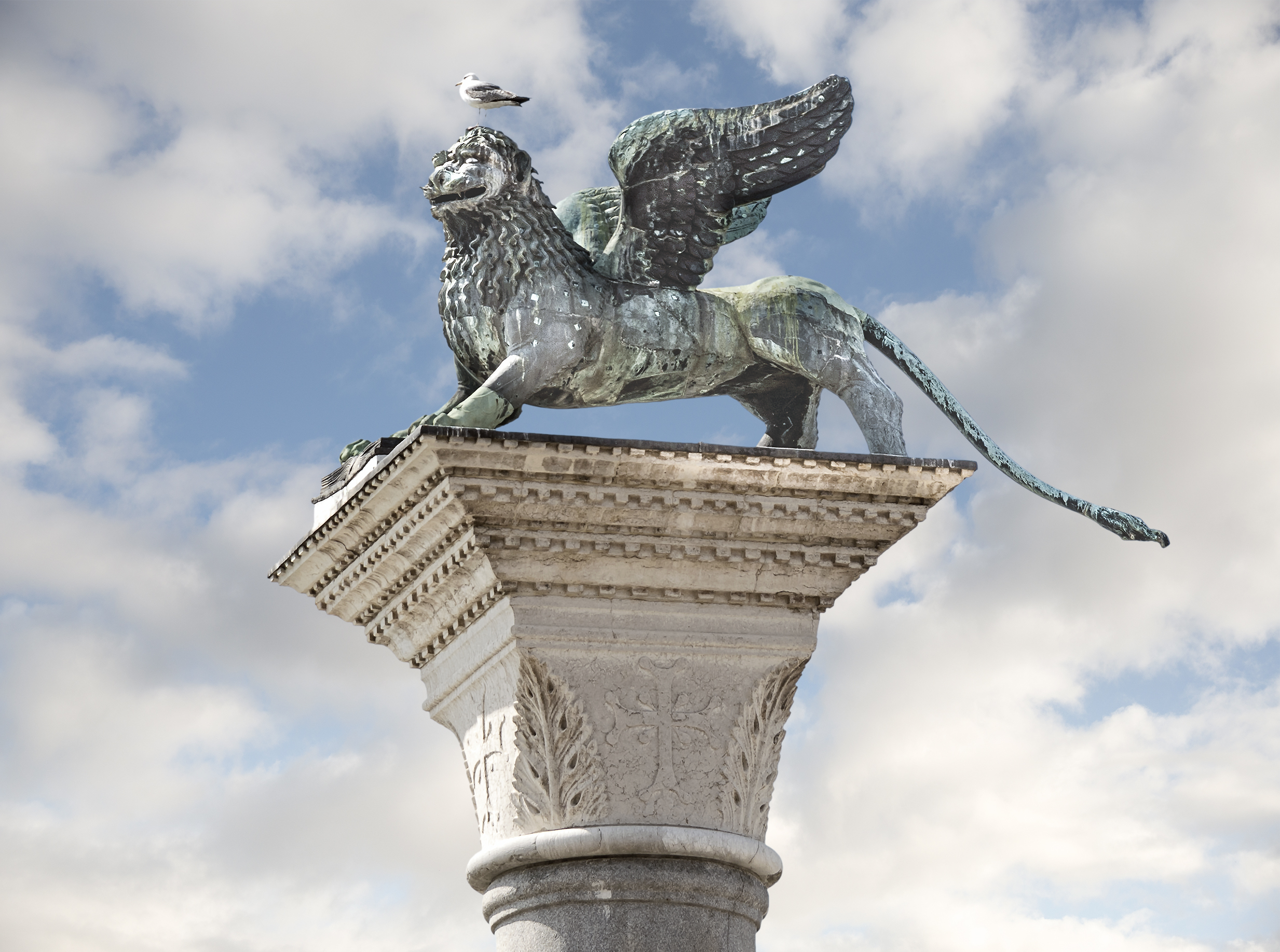
The Lion of Venice in Piazzetta

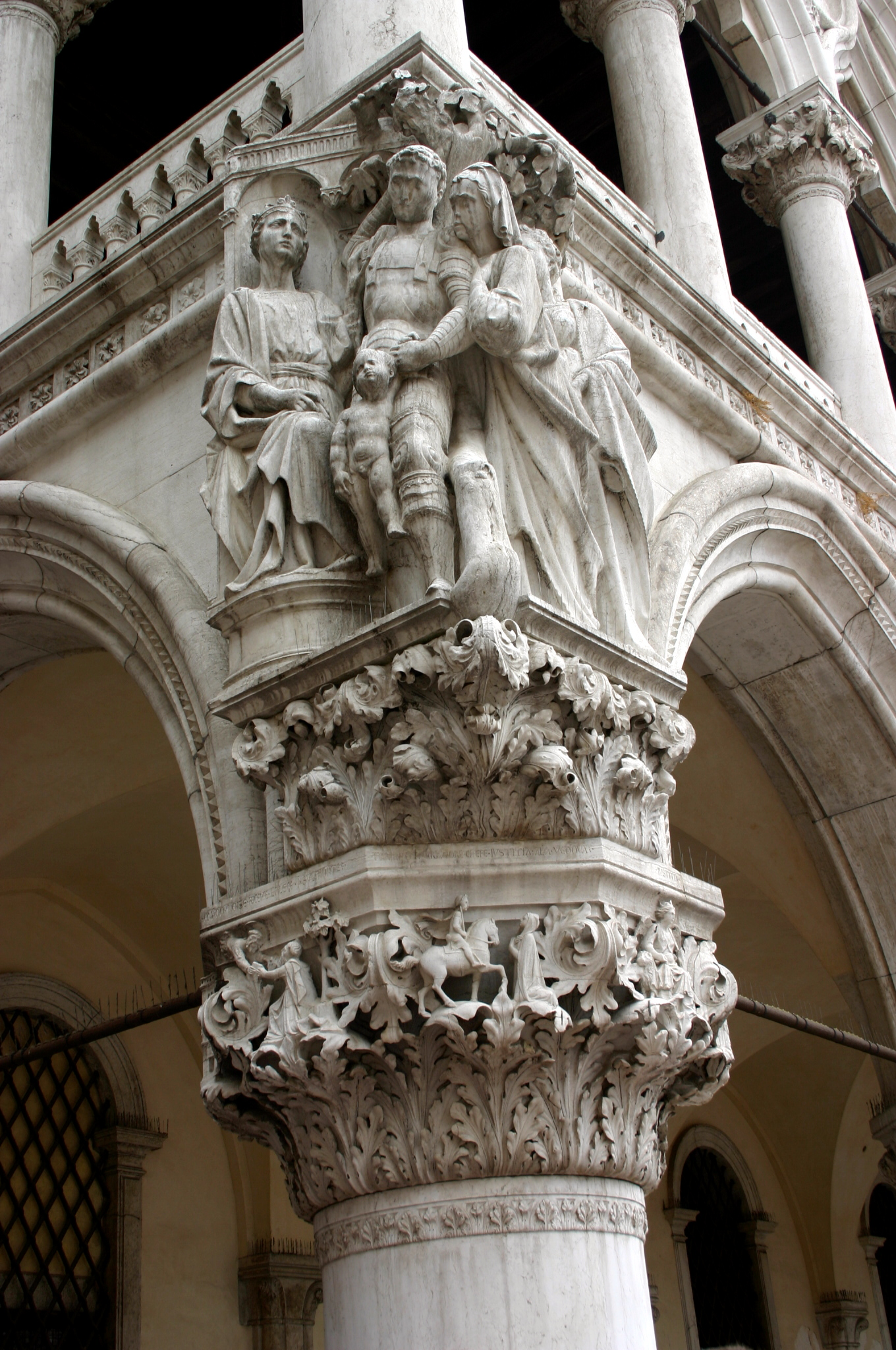
Judgment of Solomon on N.W. corner of the Doge's Palace
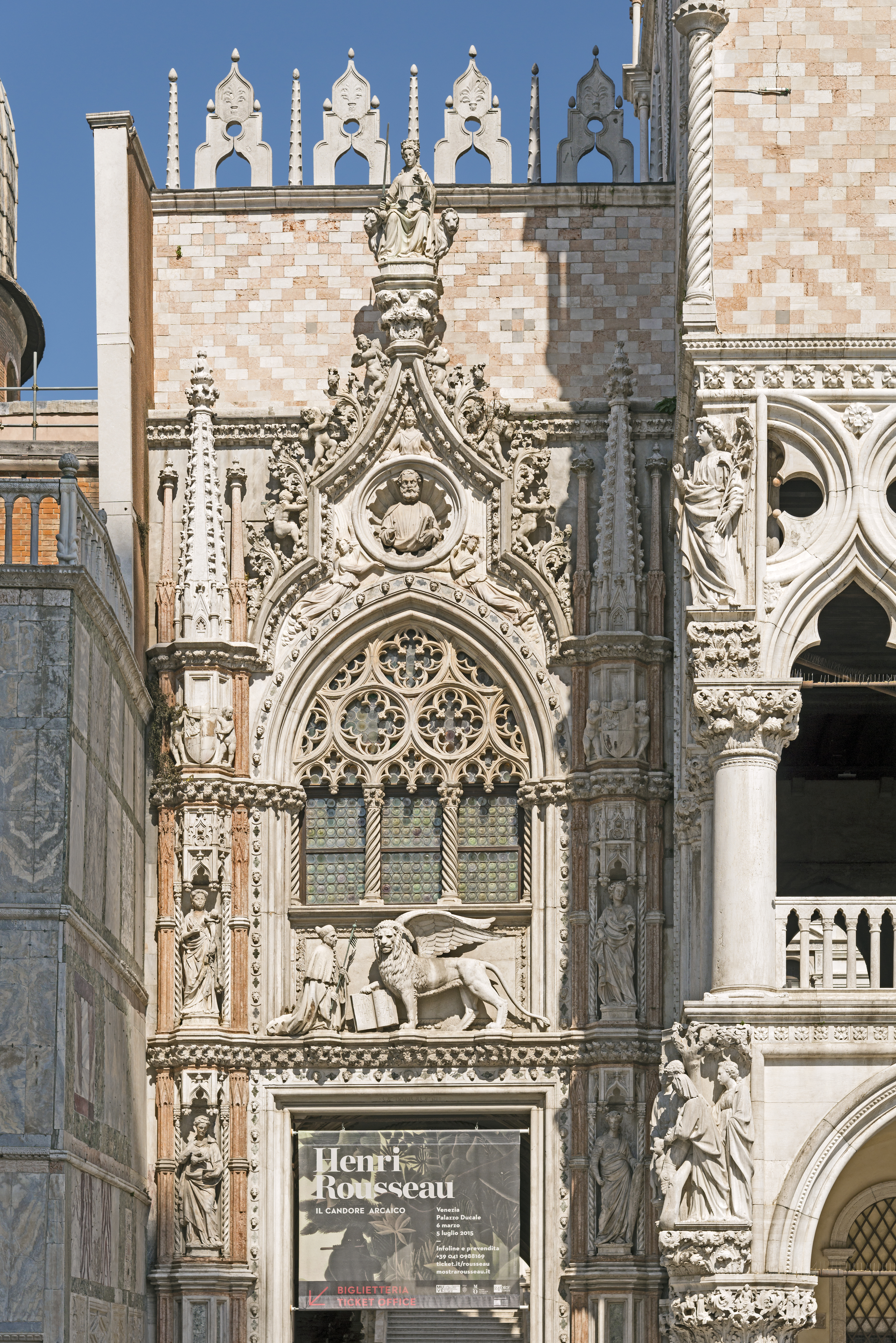
The Porta della Carta by Giovanni & Bartolomeo Bon

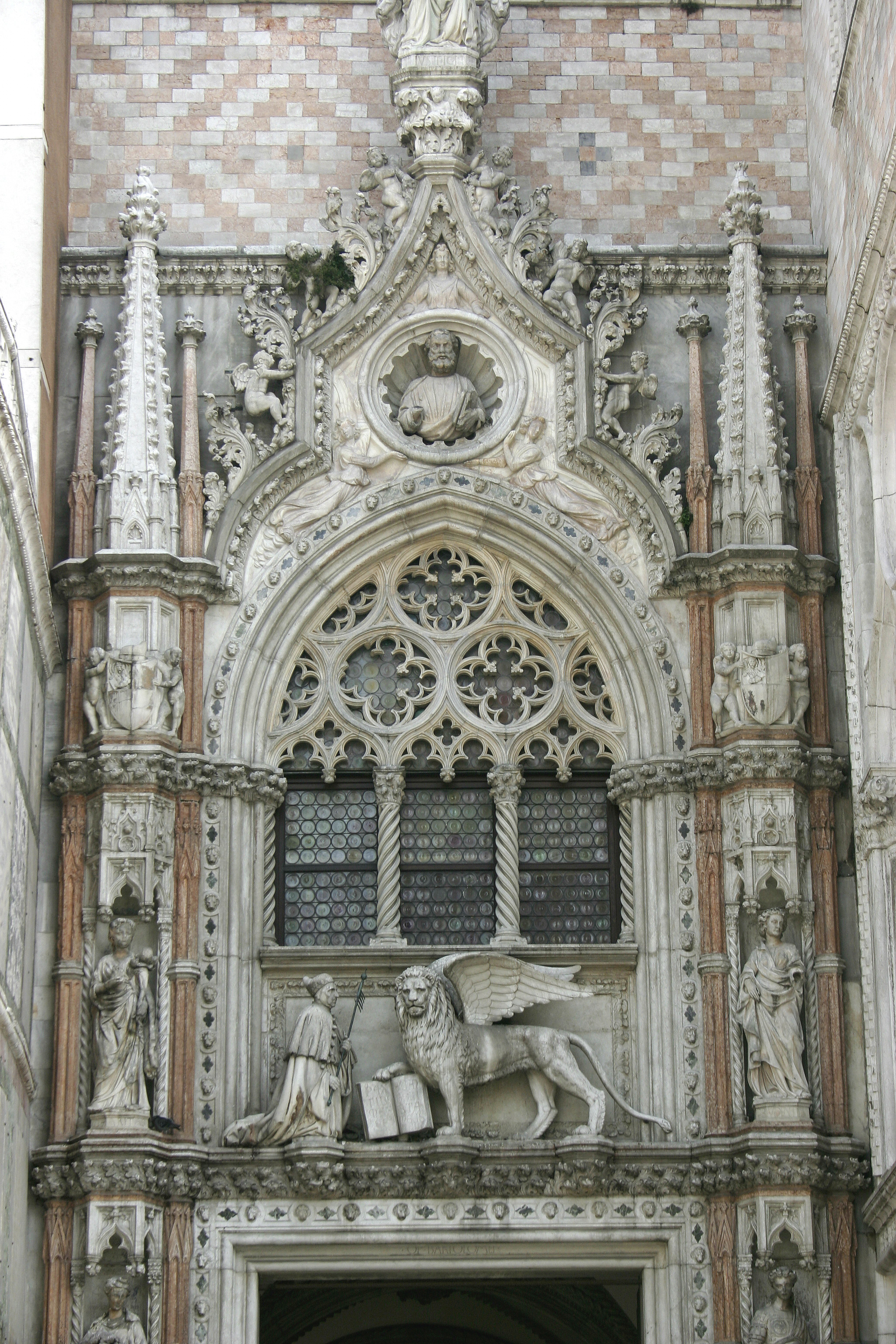
Porta della Carta (central part)

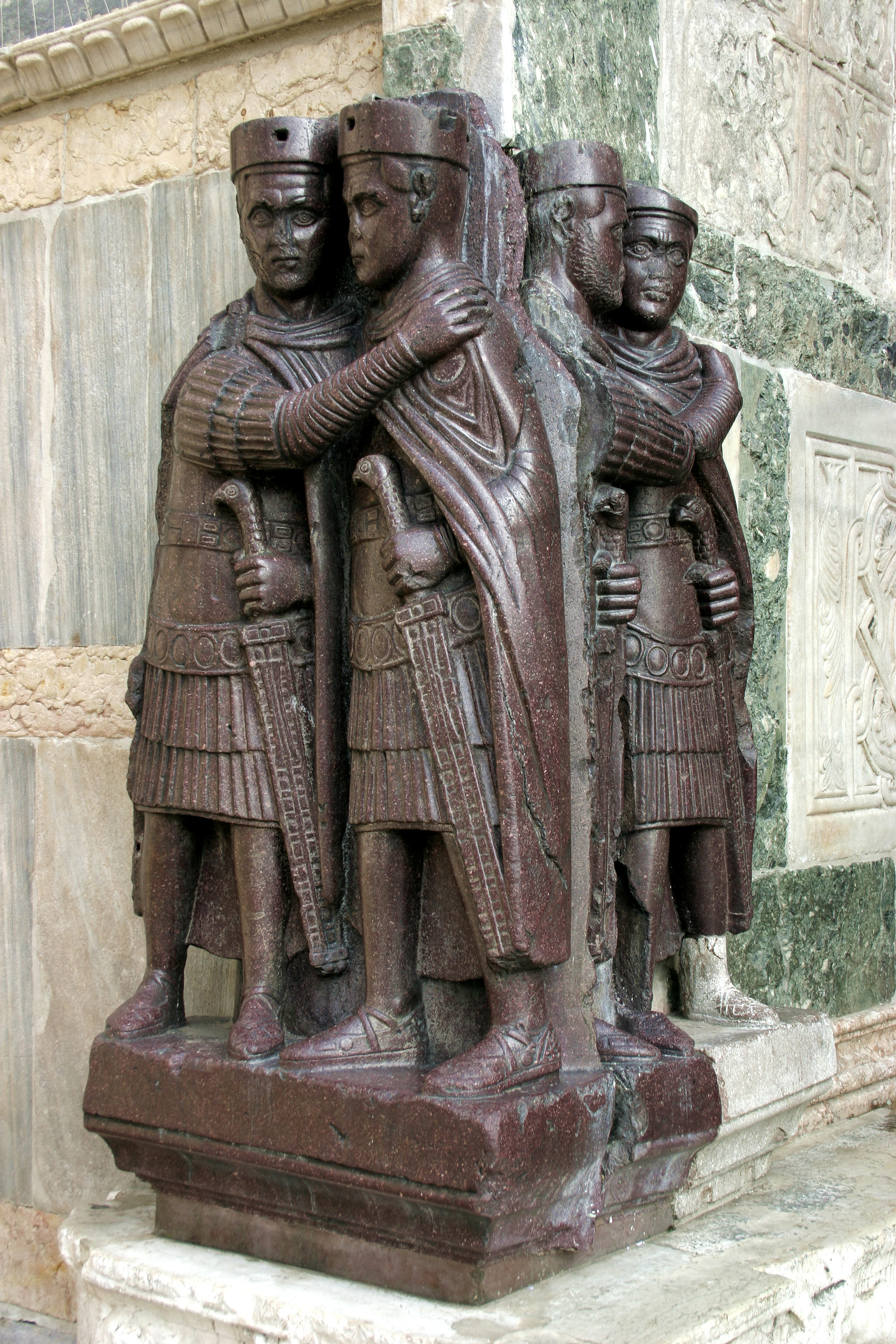
The figures carved in porphyry and known as the Tetrarchs

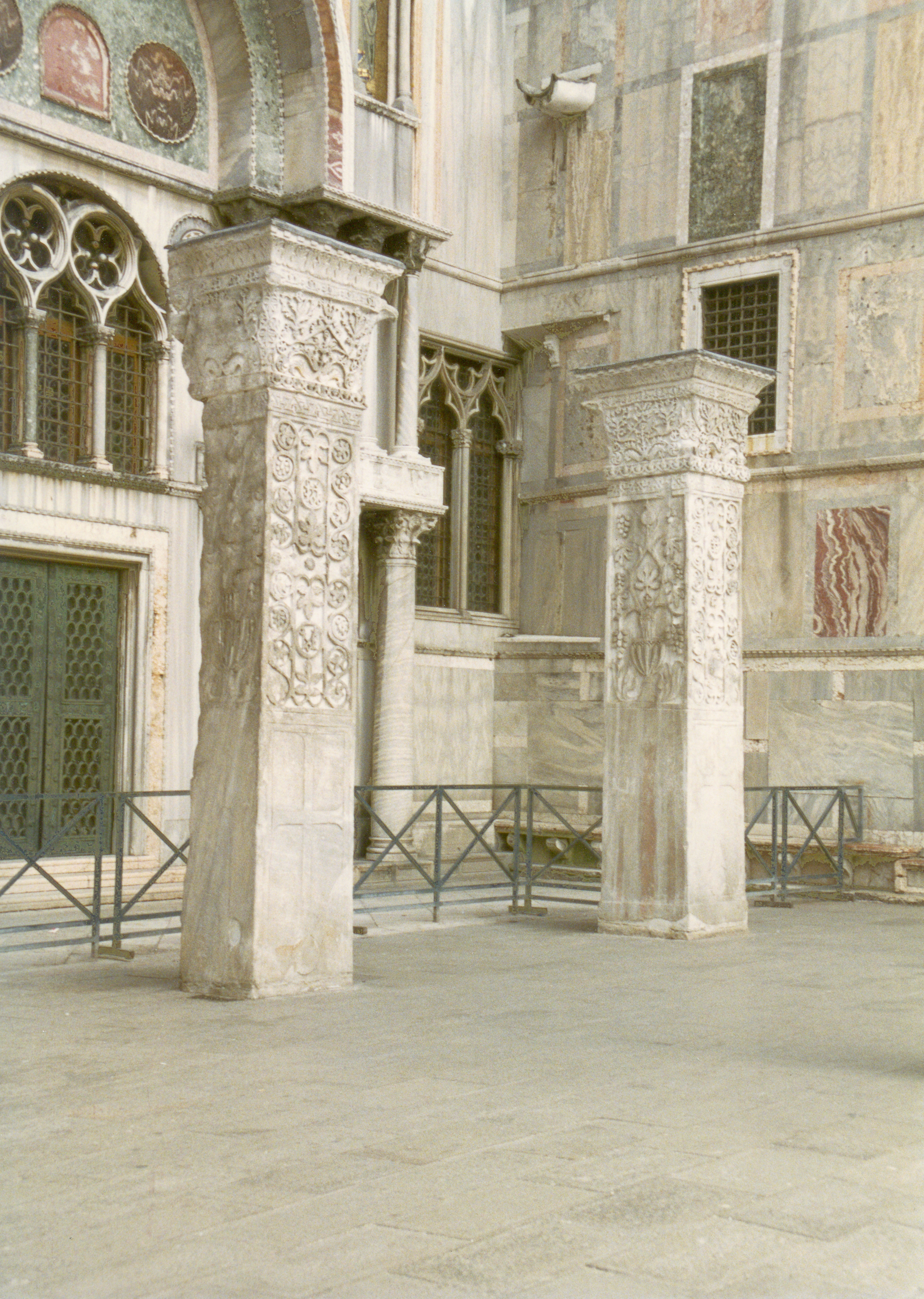
The Pillars from St Polyeuktos, Constantinople, generally known as the Pillars of Acre

== History ==
The history of the Piazza San Marco can be conveniently covered in four periods, but the only pre-renaissance buildings and monuments still standing there are St Mark's, the Doge's Palace and the two great columns in the Piazzetta.

=== Beginnings (800–1100) ===
The first patron saint of Venice was St Theodore, a Greek warrior saint, and the first chapel of the Doge was dedicated to him. It was probably built about 819 and stood near the site of the present church of St Mark. In 828–829 relics of St Mark were stolen from Alexandria and brought to Venice, and in time the Venetians and the Doge adopted the apostle as their new patron. He was the missionary-apostle who was said to have converted their district; the relics of an apostle would increase the importance of the city and their acquisition was a further step in the gradual process of freeing Venice from the domination of Byzantium. The relics were temporarily placed in the palace (or castle) of the Doge, Justinian Partecipacius, who provided in his will for a new church to be built. This first church of St Mark was begun on the south side of the existing chapel; by 836 construction was sufficiently advanced for the relics to be moved there. The design of the church was based on the Church of the Twelve Apostles in Constantinople and it seems to have covered the same area as the central part of the present church. A campanile was first built in the time of Doge Pietro Tribuno (888–91).

At that time there was probably an empty space covered with grass in front of the new church, but it cannot have extended more than about 60 metres to the west, where there was a stream (the Rio Baratario) bisecting the area now occupied by the Piazza. On the other side of this stream was a small church dedicated to San Geminiano. The Doge's palace, in the same area as its modern successor, was at that time surrounded by water. The lagoon was to the south, the Rio di Palazzo (the canal beneath the Bridge of Sighs) to the east, and another stream to the north between the palace and the church. There was an inlet from the lagoon occupying much of the space now covered by the Piazzetta and this seems to have been used as a dock for the city.

In 976 there was a rebellion against the Doge and the church was set on fire. The wooden parts, including the roof and wooden dome, were probably lost, but the church was not completely destroyed and it seems to have been rebuilt much as before. In 1063 a complete rebuilding commenced. The new church was finished in the time of Doge Vitale Falier (1084–96), and in its main structure this is the present church, though the west front facing the Piazza was then in the Romanesque style with undecorated brickwork (like the exterior of the apse today). It had five domes, but their exterior profile was low, unlike the present high, onion-shaped structures.

=== Medieval piazza (1100–1490) ===
Great changes to the area came when Sebastiano Ziani was Doge (1172–78). Venice was growing in importance and the Doge was a very wealthy man. He initiated the changes which created the piazza as we know it. The Rio Baratario was filled in and the church of San Geminiano on the far side was demolished and rebuilt much farther back at the western end of what became the Piazza. An orchard which occupied part of the area was acquired from the convent of San Zaccharia and the Doge bought up a number of buildings which obstructed the site. By his will he left these buildings to the state and in due course they were demolished to clear the area. The rebuilding of the 9th-century Doge's palace also commenced in his time as Doge. The precise date of the various new buildings is not known and much must have been done in the time of his son, Pietro Ziani, who was Doge from 1205 to 1229.

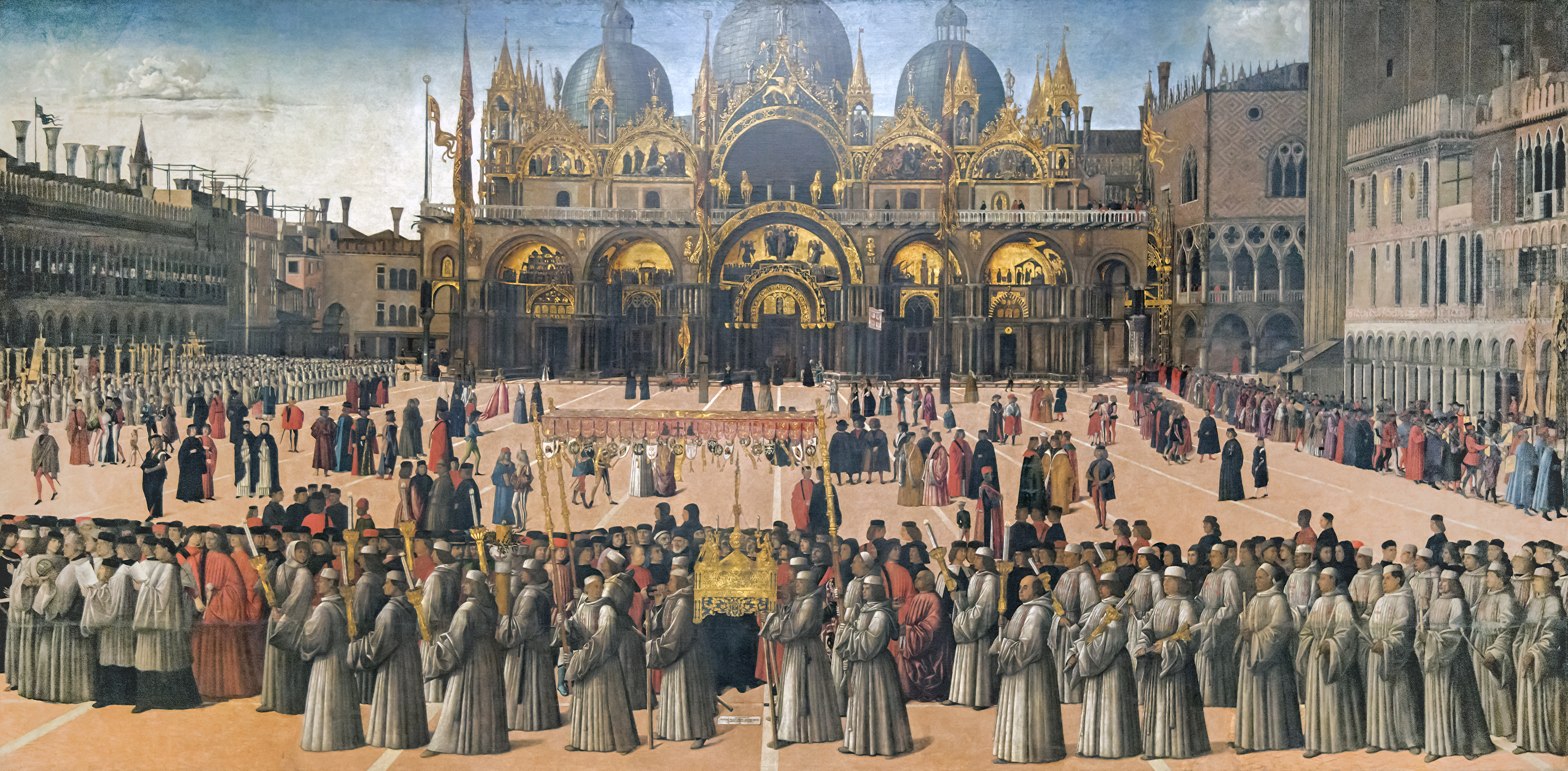
Procession in the Piazza San Marco by Gentile Bellini, depicting the piazza in 1496

The area of the piazza was now defined by the erection of buildings on the north and south sides. On the north side were the procuratie, residences and offices for the procurators of St Mark. The original procuratie were a range of two-storey buildings with a continuous arcade of stilted (i.e. tall and narrow) Byzantine arches below and a single storey above, with two windows above each arch. The ground floor rooms were let out for shops to provide an income. These buildings remained in place for about 300 years and we can see exactly how they looked in 1496 in Gentile Bellini's painting of a procession in the piazza. This painting also shows the buildings on the opposite (south) side of the Piazza, of which the most important was the Ospizio Orseolo, an inn or hostel for pilgrims going to the Holy Land. It can be seen that the piazza was then considerably narrower than it is today, because these buildings abutted directly against the west wall of the campanile.

In 1204, Constantinople was captured in the course of the 4th Crusade and, both at that time and later during the 13th century, much valuable material was taken from the city and shipped back for the adornment of Venice. This included marbles and pillars for the façade of St Mark's, the two square pillars in the piazzetta known (wrongly) as the Pillars of Acre and probably also the Pietra del Bando (near the south west corner of St Mark's) and the four porphyry figures known as the Tetrarchs, which were eventually installed near the entrance to the Doge's Palace from the piazzetta.

The two great granite columns in the Piazzetta are usually said to have been erected about 1170, but it is now thought more probable that this was done in the time of Doge Ranieri Zeno (1253–68) about 1268; the bases and capitals are 13th-century. Their origin is unknown, but Chios is suggested as possible. The lion is first mentioned in a decree of the Great Council in 1293, and the wording makes it clear that it was already on the pillar at that date. A statue of St Theodore (but not the present statue) was in place by 1329.

It was also at this time, in the later 13th century, that St Mark's was being given its new west façade embellished with marble and mosaics and trophies from Constantinople, including the four horses.

The original 9th-century Doge's palace was soon found too small for the number of patricians sitting on the Great Council after the right to do so was made hereditary in 1297, and rebuilding started in 1340. Work was held up by the Black Death in 1348 but the first stage was completed by 1365. This comprised the front part of the palace facing the lagoon, but in the Piazzetta the new building only extended to the seventh pillar back from the front corner, now marked by a circular relief of Venice as Justice on the outside of the first-floor arcade. Further back, part of the old palace, known as the Palace of Justice, remained, much as it had stood for about 200 years.

Because of the great expense involved, nothing more was done for many years, but in 1422 the Doge Tomaso Mocenigo insisted that for the honour of the city the remaining part of the old palace should be demolished and the new part extended. It was resolved that the existing façade should be continued in the same style, and work started in 1424 under the new Doge Francesco Foscari. The extended façade had reached the corner by 1438 and the point where the 15th-century part joins the 14th-century part can only be recognised by the circular relief of Justice above the seventh pillar from the front corner and the fact that that pillar is larger than the others, having held up the corner of the building for 80 years. The capitals on this façade are, for the most part, copies of the existing capitals on the front façade. The last pillar, at the north-western corner of the building, is a very large column and, continuing the theme of Justice, bears a large relief carving of the Judgment of Solomon, with the archangel Gabriel above it. The sculptor is not known, although various suggestions have been made including Bartolomeo Buon from Venice and Jacopo della Quercia from Siena and several art historians think that the sculpture of the Judgment of Solomon (which must have been made in the period 1424/38) shows influence from Tuscany. Eduardo Arslan, after reviewing all the theories in 1971, concluded that this sculpture "remains for us a great mystery".

In 1438 a contract was made with Giovanni and Bartolomeo Buon for the construction of a great ceremonial doorway into the palace. This was the Porta della Carta and connected the newly constructed wing of the palace with the south wall of St Mark's. Giovanni was nearing the end of his life and the gateway is mainly the work of Bartolomeo. It was completed by 1442 and included a sculpture of the Doge Francesco Foscari kneeling before the lion of St Mark. The statues of the cardinal virtues on either side were by another hand. Originally the whole gateway was painted and gilded. This is just visible in the right background of Gentile Bellini's painting of 1496, which shows the piazza in its state at this time, still narrow and with the old 13th-century buildings on either side.

=== From the Renaissance to the fall of the Republic (1490–1797) ===
In 1493 an astronomical clock was commissioned by Venice and it was decided to install it in a new clocktower in the Piazza with a high archway beneath it leading into the street known as the Merceria, which leads to the Rialto. The building, which was probably designed by Codussi, was started in 1496, a section of the original Procuratie being demolished for the purpose. The building was completed with the clock installed by February 1499. It can be seen, flanked by the original Procuratie building, in de Barbari's woodcut of Venice in 1500. The Procuratie then were only two storeys high and the tower stood higher above them than it does today.

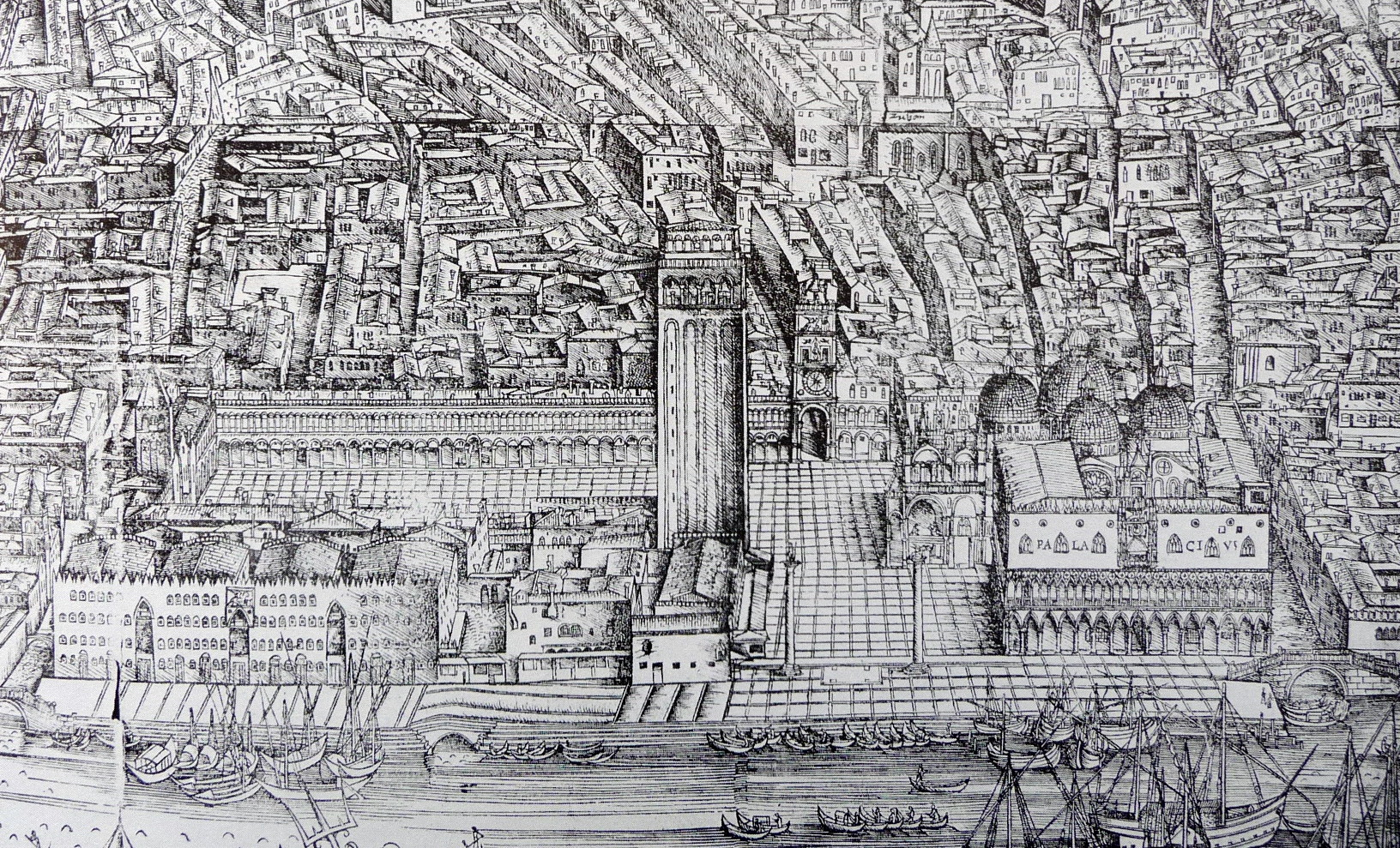
The Piazza & Piazzetta in 1500 with the newly completed Clocktower but the original 13th-century Procuratie (from de Barbari's woodcut of Venice)

Buildings on either side to support the tower were added by 1506 and in 1512, when there was a fire in the old Procuratie, it became obvious that the whole range would have to be rebuilt.

Although Venice was then at war with much of Europe (War of the League of Cambrai) the whole of the south side of the Piazza was rebuilt, starting in 1517. The new buildings, known today as the Procuratie Vecchie, were three storeys high instead of two. Like the previous Procuratie they had an arcade on the ground level with two windows above each arch, but without the high Byzantine arches and with classical details.

In 1527 Jacopo Sansovino came to Venice, fleeing from the sack of Rome, and by 1529 he had been appointed as Proto (consultant architect and buildings manager) to the Procurators of St. Mark. The Procurators wished to rebuild the old buildings on the south side of the Piazza, but Sansovino persuaded them that the opportunity should be taken to enlarge the Piazza and that these buildings should be demolished and the building line moved back clear of the campanile. He also convinced them that the old hostelries and shops on the west side of the Piazzetta opposite the Doge's Palace should be replaced by a new building worthy of the site. It was decided that the library of books and manuscripts, which had been bequeathed to the city by Cardinal Bessarion but had still not found a permanent home, should be housed there and Sansovino originally intended that the façade of this building (the Libreria) should eventually be continued along the south side of the Piazza and round the south-west corner as far as the church of San Geminiano in the middle of the west side. These changes also made it necessary to rebuild the Loggetta and at the same time the government of Venice had commissioned Sansovino to rebuild the mint (the Zecca) on the west side of the Libreria. All these works were proceeding together for many years after 1537. The new Loggetta was complete by 1545 and the Zecca by 1547 (though a third storey was added by 1566), but work on the Libreria was held up by the difficulty of finding new premises for the businesses which were displaced as well as by shortage of funds and only sixteen bays (out of twenty-one) had been finished before the death of Sansovino in 1570. By that date it had not yet been possible to start on the rebuilding of the south side of the Piazza beyond the Libreria.

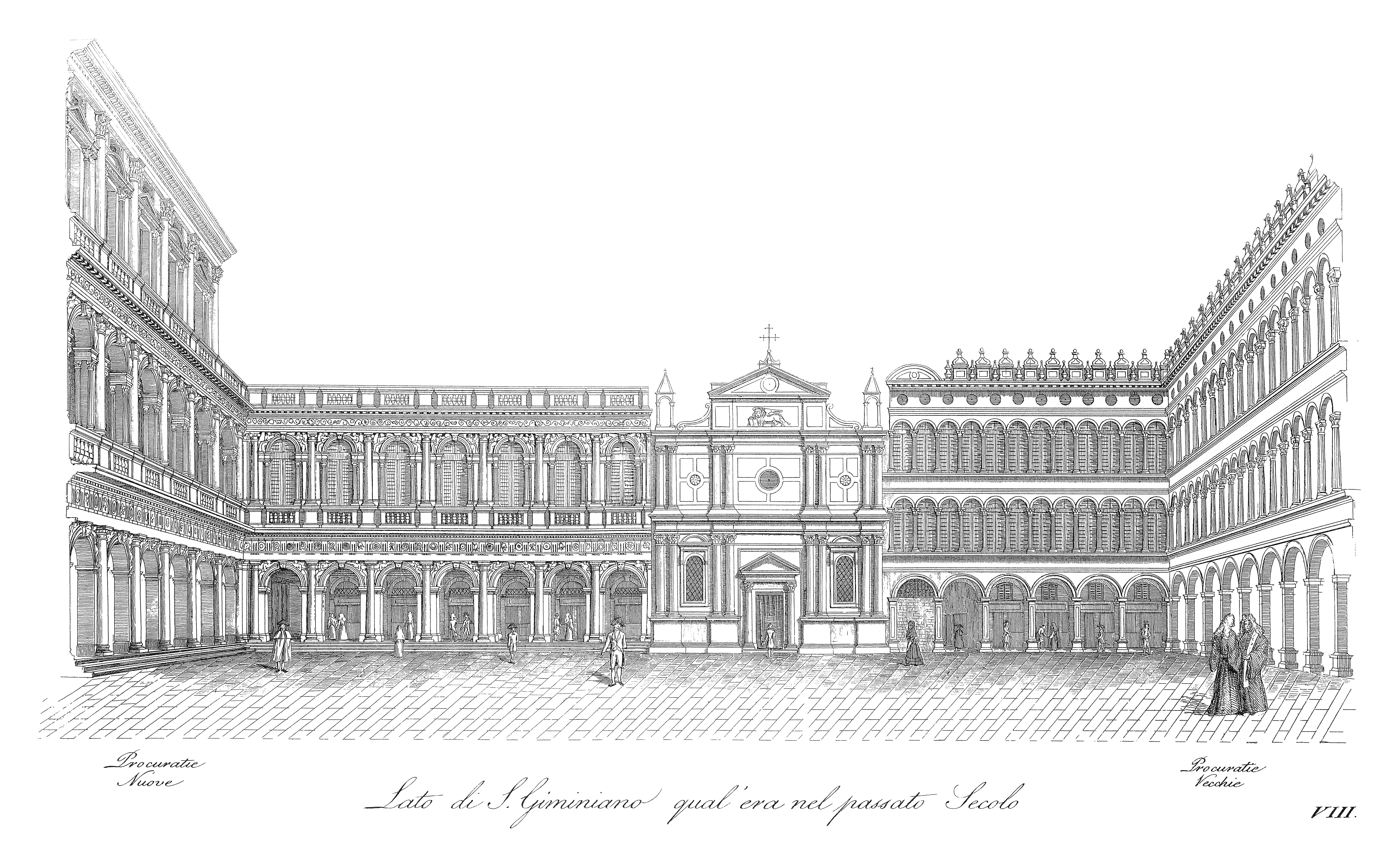
The west end of the Piazza with the church of San Geminiano, as it was from 1640 to 1807 (print from Quadri-Moretti, 1831)

Sansovino also completed the rebuilding of the old church of San Geminiano at the west end of the Piazza, facing St Mark's. Much of the work had been done before he took it over in 1557, but he was responsible for the façade in white Istrian stone. He also continued the range of Procuratie Vecchie on the north side of the Piazza round the corner as far as this church.

After the death of Sansovino funds were at last made available to start the rebuilding of the south side of the Piazza in its new position well clear of the campanile. His idea of a two-storey building continuing the façade of the Libreria had to be abandoned, as the Procurators required three storeys. However, Vincenzo Scamozzi based the design on the façade of the Libreria and completed ten bays between 1582 and 1586, The Procuratie Nuove (New Procuracies), as they are called, were not completed until 1640, when the remaining bays on the south side were completed and continued round the corner to the church of San Geminiano by Baldassarre Longhena.

=== Napoleon and later (1797 onwards) ===
Venice surrendered to Napoleon on 12 May 1797. By 4 June a "Tree of Liberty" had been placed in the Piazza. Soon afterwards stonemasons were sent out on the orders of the Municipality to destroy images of the winged lion, which was seen as a symbol of Venetian independence and aristocratic rule. On the Porta della Carta in the Piazzetta the head of Doge Francesco Foscari was removed as well as that of the lion before which he was kneeling. (They were replaced by copies later in the century). The French ordered the four horses of San Marco to be taken down and sent to Paris together with the bronze lion on the column in the Piazzetta. They were removed in December 1797.

In January 1798 under the Treaty of Campoformio the Austrians moved into Venice in place of the French. This first Austrian ascendancy lasted from 1798 to 19 January 1806, when the French moved back after Napoleon's victories at Austerlitz and Jena and his establishment of the kingdom of Italy in 1804. Napoleon appointed his stepson Eugène de Beauharnais as his viceroy and in 1807 it was ordered that the Procuratie Nuove were to become the royal palace for his occupation. Napoleon himself paid a ceremonial visit to Venice later in 1807, landing at the Piazzetta on his way to the new palace.

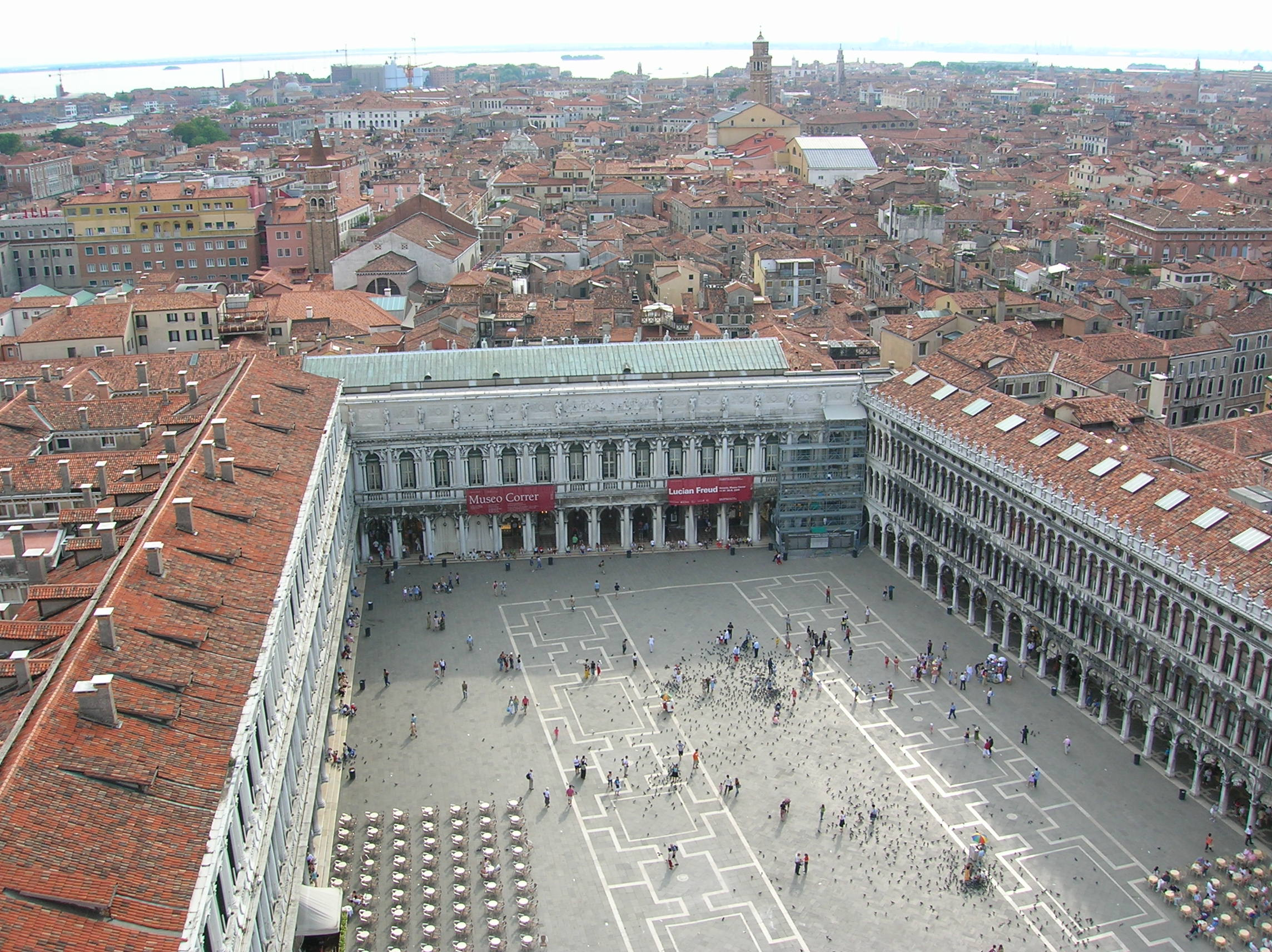
The west end of the Piazza showing the Ala Napoleonica

It was decided that the new palace should extend across the whole of the west end of the Piazza and this made it necessary to demolish the church of San Geminiano, rebuilt by Sansovino, and also the buildings on either side, Sansovino's extension of the Procuratie Vecchie to the north and part of the Procuratie Nuove to the south. The original architect was Gianni Antolini from Milan, but the new building caused much controversy and in 1810 he was replaced by Giovanni Soli from Modena. The present building, known as the Ala Napoleonica (the Napoleonic Wing) was built between 1810 and 1813. The façade of the two lower storeys is in the manner of the Procuratie Nuove, but the upper storey, containing the ceremonial entrance and the ballroom, has no windows or arches and is decorated with statues and sculpture in low relief. In the centre there was originally to have been a statue of Napoleon as Jupiter with the imperial arms above, but this was abandoned after the fall of Napoleon in 1814 and there is now no focal point on the west side of the Piazza.

After the abdication of Napoleon the Austrians re-occupied Venice (under the Treaty of Fontainebleau) in April 1814. The Austrian chancellor, Prince Metternich, was instrumental in arranging the return to Venice of the four horses of St Mark and the lion from the Piazzetta. The horses were re-installed in front of the Basilica on 13 December 1815, but the bronze lion had been badly broken and had to be repaired. It was placed back on its pillar in April 1816.

== Pavement ==
The Piazza was paved in the late 12th century with bricks laid in a herringbone pattern. Bands of light-colored stone ran parallel to the long axis of the main piazza. These lines were probably used in setting up market stalls and in organizing frequent ceremonial processions. This original pavement design can be seen in paintings of the late Middle Ages and through the Renaissance, such as Gentile Bellini's Procession in Piazza San Marco of 1496.

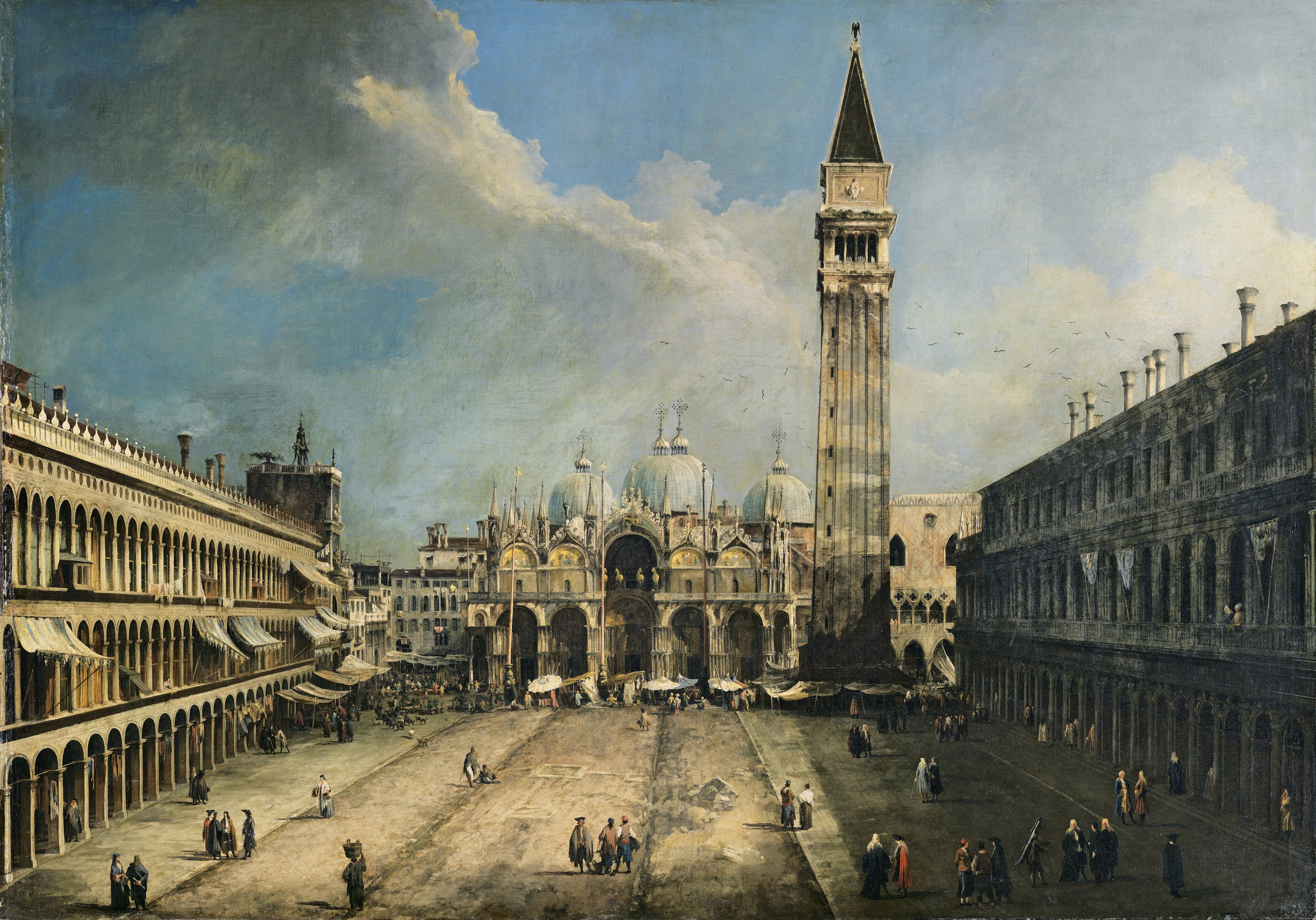
Canaletto's painting of 1723 showing the laying of the new pavement

In 1723 the bricks were replaced with a more complex geometrical pavement design laid out by Venetian architect Andrea Tirali. Little is known about Tirali's reasoning for the particulars of the design. Some have speculated that the pattern was used to regulate market stalls, or to recall their former presence in the square. Others believe the pattern was drawn from oriental rugs, a popular luxury item in this trading centre.

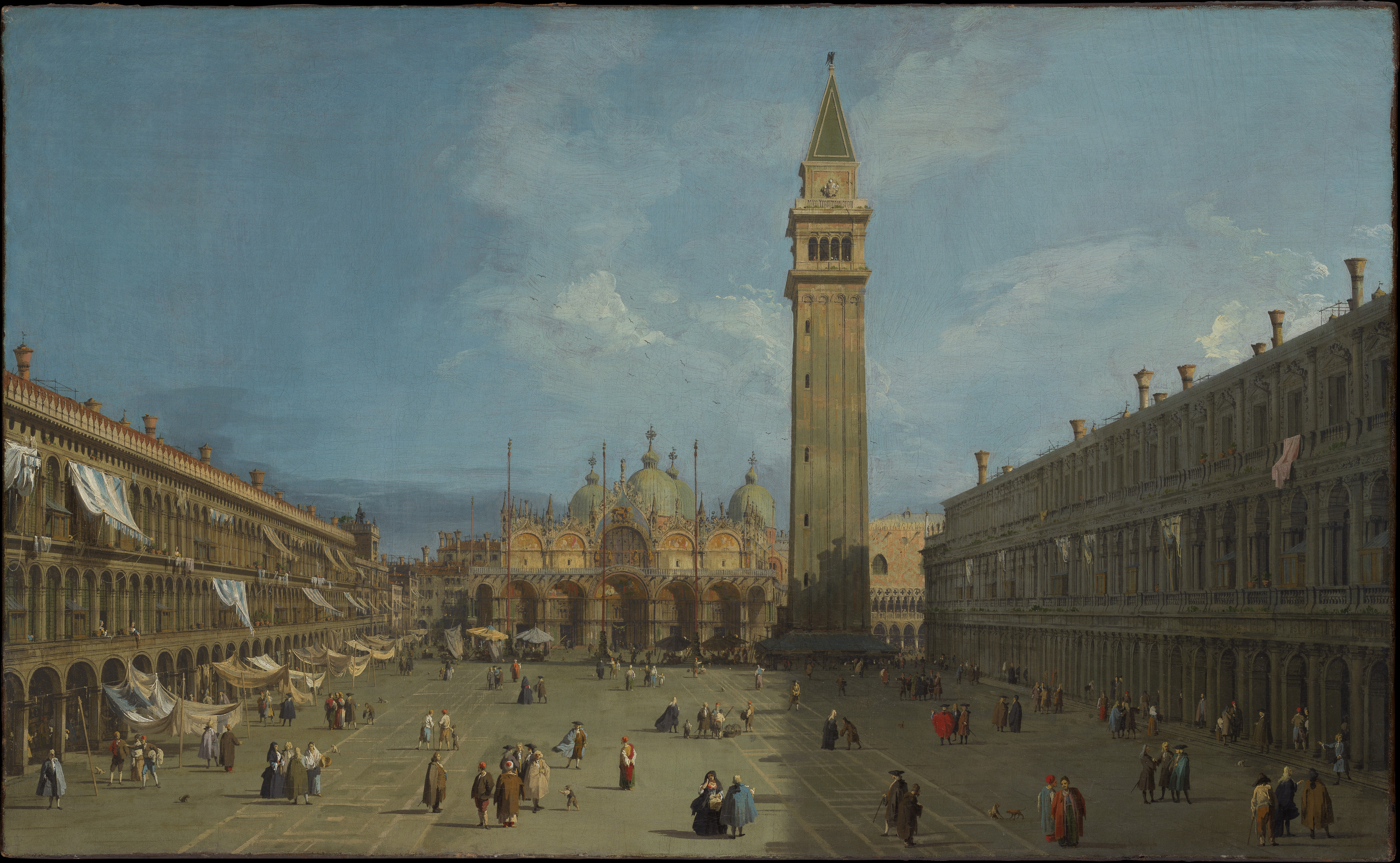
Piazza San Marco with the Basilica (1720) by Canaletto

A field of dark-colored igneous trachyte with geometrical designs executed in white Istrian stone, similar to travertine composed the design. Squares of diagonally laid blocks alternated with rectangular and oval designs along broad parallel bands. The squares were pitched to the centre, like a bowl, where a drain conducted surface water into a below-grade drainage system. The pattern connected the central portal of the Basilica with the centre of the western opening into the piazza. This line more closely parallels the façade of the Procuratie Vecchie, leaving a nearly triangular space adjacent to the Procuratie Nuove with its wider end closed off by the Campanile. The pattern continued past the campanile, stopping at a line connecting the three large flagpoles and leaving the space immediately in front of the Basilica undecorated. A smaller version of the same pattern in the Piazzetta paralleled Sansovino's Library, leaving a narrow trapezoid adjacent to the Doge's palace with the wide end closed off by the southwest corner of the Basilica. This smaller pattern had the internal squares inclined to form non-orthogonal quadrilaterals.

The overall alignment of the pavement pattern serves to visually lengthen the long axis and reinforce the position of the Basilica at its head. This arrangement mirrors the interior relationship of nave to altar within the cathedral.

As part of the design, the level of the piazza was raised by approximately one meter to mitigate flooding and allow more room for the internal drains to carry water to the Grand Canal.

In 1890, the pavement was renewed "due to wear and tear". The new work closely follows Tirali's design, but eliminated the oval shapes and cut off the west edge of the pattern to accommodate the Napoleonic wing at that end of the Piazza.

== Flooding ==
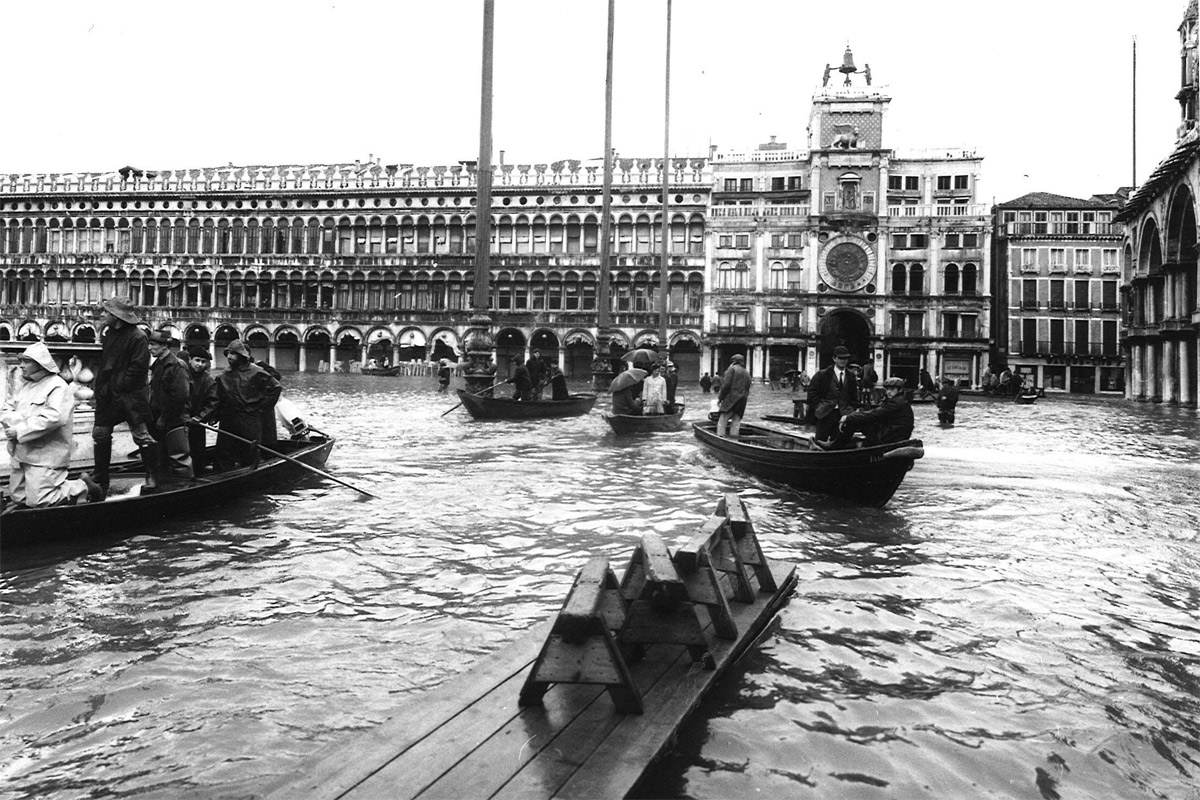
Piazza San Marco during the flood of 4 November 1966

The Piazza San Marco is not far above sea level and during the acqua alta, the "high water" from storm surges from the Adriatic or heavy rain, it is quick to flood. Water pouring into the drains in the piazza runs directly into the Grand Canal. This normally works well but, when the sea is high, it has the reverse effect, with water from the lagoon surging up into the square. A historically important flood was the 1966 Venice flood, when an abnormal occurrence of high tides, rain-swollen rivers and a severe sirocco wind caused the canals to rise to a height of 194 centimetres (6 feet 4 inches).

== See also ==
- List of buildings and structures in Venice
- History of the Doge's Palace in Venice

Preceded by Grand Canal	Venice landmarks Piazza San Marco	Succeeded by Punta della Dogana
