= Procuratie =

Three connected buildings along Saint Mark's Square in Venice

Coordinates: 45°26′3″N 12°20′16″E

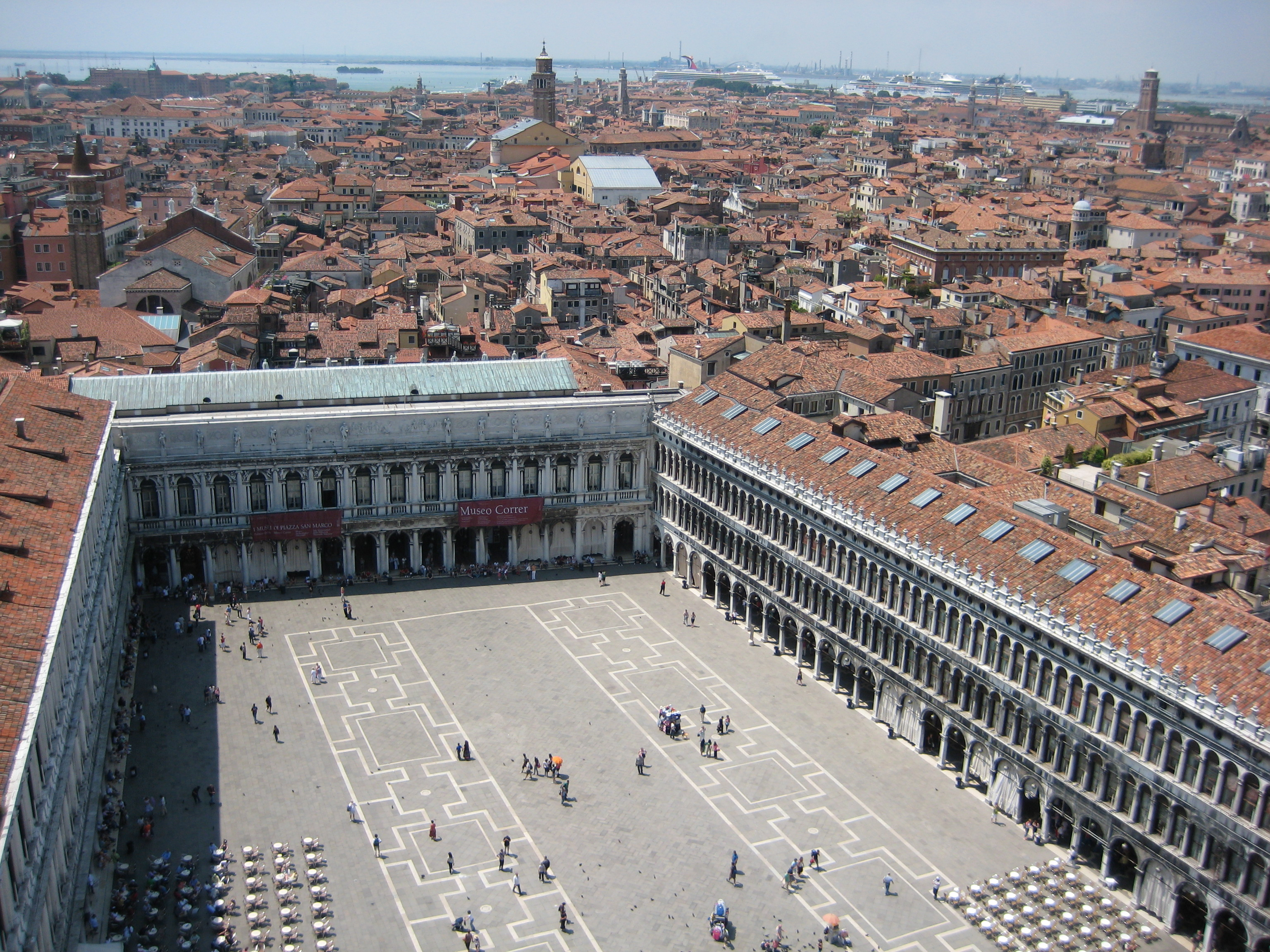
- view of Saint Mark's Square; Procuratie Nuove (left), Procuratie Nuovissime (centre), and Procuratie Vecchie (right)
- Procuratie Vecchie
- Built: c. 1514–1538
- Architect: Pietro Bon and Zuan Celestro (attributed)
- Architectural style(s): Early Renaissance
- Procuratie Nuove
- Built: 1583–c. 1660
- Architect: Vincenzo Scamozzi and Francesco Smeraldi
- Architectural style(s): High Renaissance
- Procuratie Nuovissime
- (Napoleonic Wing)
- Built: 1807–1815
- Architect: Giovanni Maria Solis
- Architectural style(s): Neoclassical

Saint Mark's Square

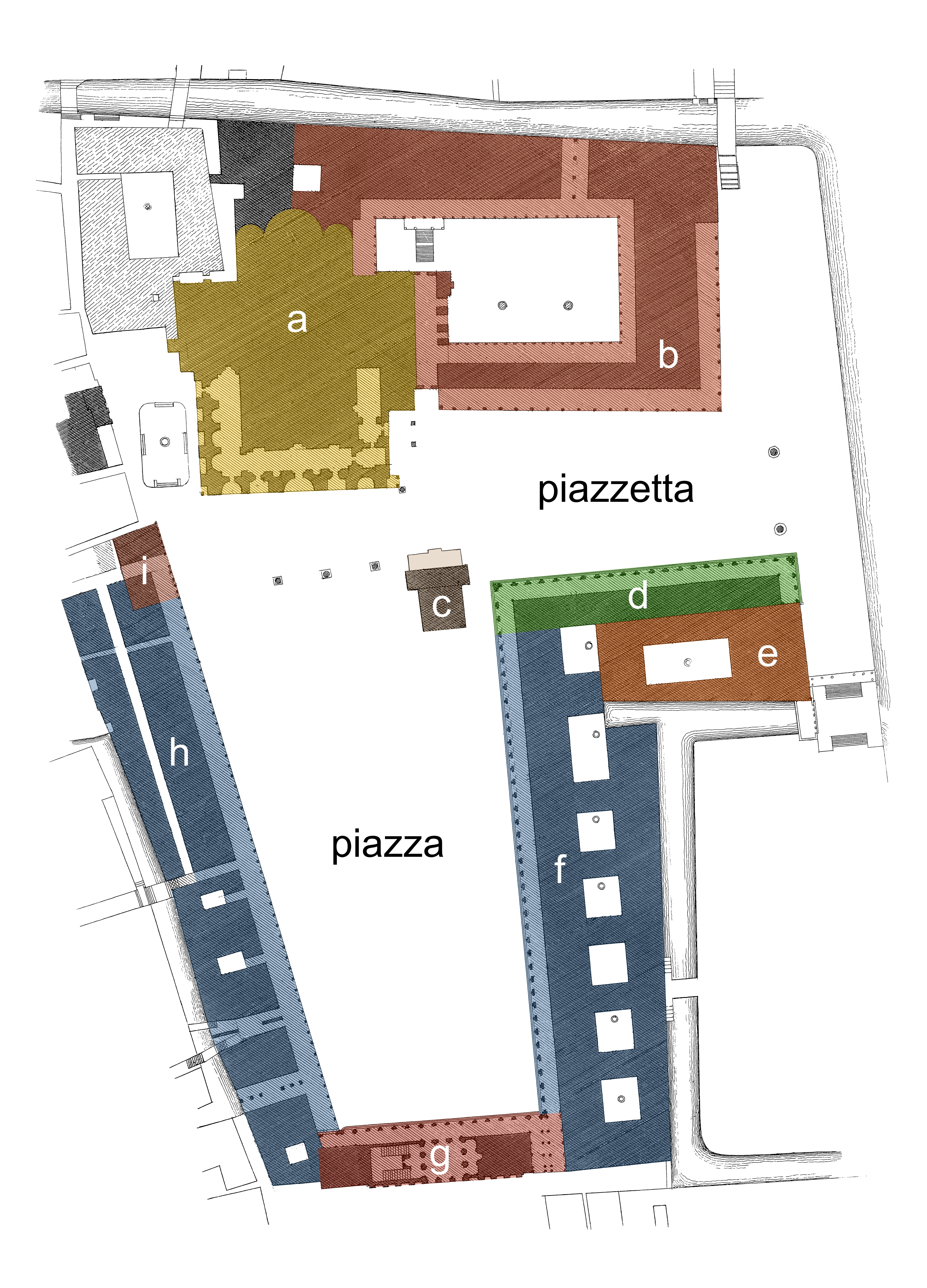
a. St Mark's Basilica
b. Doge's Palace
c. Bell tower and Loggetta
d. Marciana Library
e. Mint
f. Procuratie Nuove (Royal Palace (Venice))
g. Procuratie Nuovissime
h. Procuratie Vecchie
i. Clock tower

The Procuratie (English: Procuracies) are three connected buildings along the perimeter of Saint Mark's Square in Venice, Italy. Two of the buildings, the Procuratie Vecchie (Old Procuracies) and the Procuratie Nuove (New Procuracies), were constructed by the procurators of Saint Mark, the second-highest dignitaries in the government of the Republic of Venice, who were charged with administering the treasury of the Church of Saint Mark as well as the financial affairs of state wards and trust funds established on behalf of religious and charitable institutions.

The Procuratie Vecchie on the northern side of the square was built during the War of the League of Cambrai in the early sixteenth century to replace an earlier structure, damaged by fire. Although the war imposed financial constraints and limited innovation, it was nevertheless the first major public building in Venice to be erected in a purely classical style. It always contained apartments that were rented by the procurators as a source of revenue to finance building projects and repairs. Rental income was significant, given the prestige of the location. But the apartments were eventually sold to raise immediate money for the government, and several of them were subsequently transformed into clubhouses.

The Procuratie Nuove on the southern side housed the official residences of the procurators. Built between the late-sixteenth and mid-seventeenth centuries to replace a series of dilapidated medieval structures, it represented the culmination of an extensive programme of urban renewal that lasted over a hundred years and profoundly transformed Venice's city centre, giving it the appearance of a great classical forum. Both the official residences in the Procuratie Nuove and the rental apartments in the Procuratie Vecchie were built above arcades with space on the ground floor that was rented out for stores, workshops, and later coffeehouses, including the historic Caffè Florian, Caffè Quadri, and Caffè Lavena.

The Procuratie Nuovissime (Newest Procuracies, also known as the Napoleonic Wing) was built during the second period of French occupation (1805–1815) when after the fall of the Republic of Venice, the Procuratie Nuove was transformed into the residence of the viceroy of the Kingdom of Italy. Today, much of the Procuratie Nuove and the Napoleonic Wing house the Museo Correr.

== Procurators of Saint Mark ==
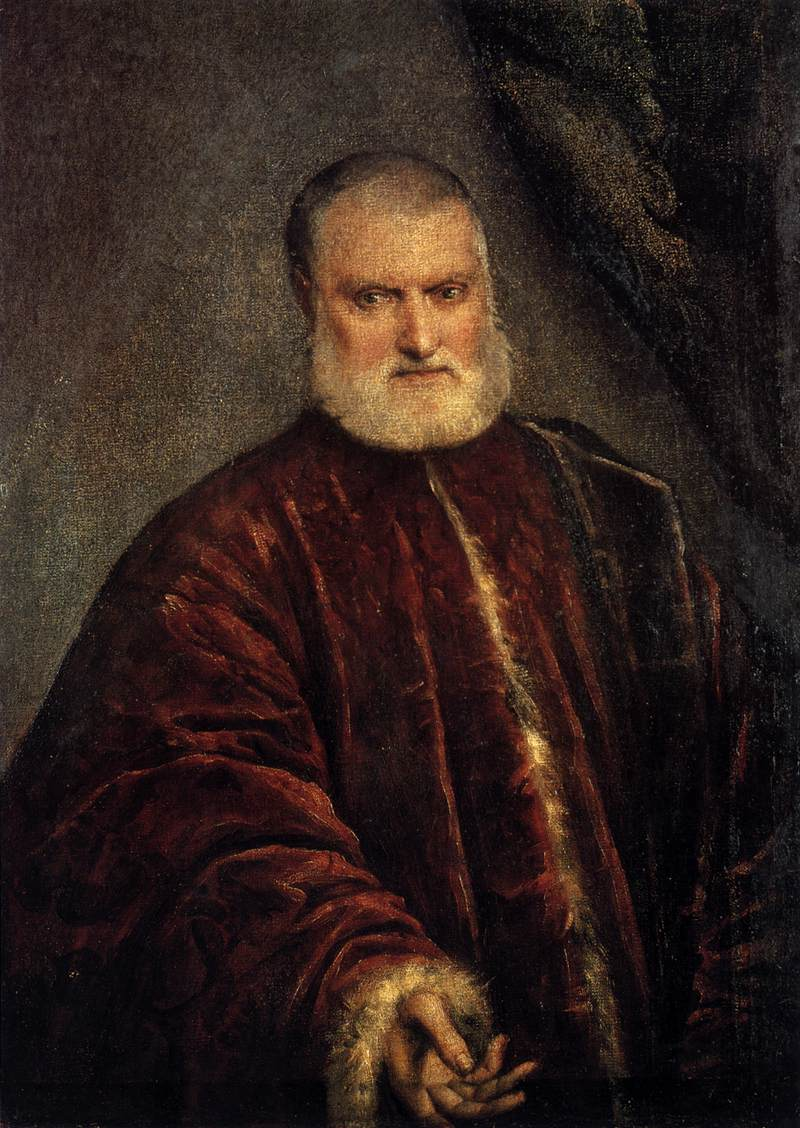
Tintoretto, Portrait of Procurator Antonio Cappello (c. 1561). One of the major proponents of urban renewal of Saint Mark's Square, Cappello was elected procurator de supra in 1523, at the age of only 29, following the payment of 8,000 ducats.

The office of procurator of Saint Mark, considered second only to that of the doge in prestige, was one of the few lifetime appointments in the Venetian government. It was routinely occupied by nobles belonging to the most influential families and typically represented the climax of a distinguished political career, although it was often an intermediate position prior to election as doge. (Note: In the 1663 edition of Venetia città nobilissima et singolare..., Martinioni records 40 procurators who, beginning in 1275, were subsequently elected doge. For the complete list, see Sansovino and Martinioni, Venetia città nobilissima et singolare..., 1663 edn., pp 299–300.)

The office originated in the ninth century with a single procurator operis Sancti Marci, nominated to assist the doge in the administration of the Church of Saint Mark, the ducal chapel. Over time the number of procurators increased. By the mid-thirteenth century there were four procurators, two of which, the procurators de supra, retained responsibility for the administration of the Church of Saint Mark and its treasury. The other two procurators, called de subtus super commissariis, administered trust funds established as pious donations on behalf of religious and charitable institutions. In 1319, there were six procurators, and in 1443 there were nine. These were divided into three procuracies: de supra (responsible for the Church of Saint Mark and its treasury), de citra (responsible for trust funds established in the sestieri (districts) of San Marco, Castello, and Cannaregio), and de ultra (responsible for trust funds established in the sestieri of San Polo, Santa Croce, and Dorsoduro). Beginning in 1516, initially to aid in the economic recovery from the War of the League of Cambrai, supernumerary procurators could also be created in moments of financial constraint in exchange for monetary contributions to the treasury. This amounted to the periodic sale of the prestigious title. The number of procurators fluctuated thereafter: in 1521, there were eighteen. At times, the number rose to forty. The effective sale of the position also made it possible for young and ambitious nobles to quickly rise to high office and to consequently exert great influence. In the sixteenth century, notably Antonio Cappello, Vettore Grimani, Federico Contarini, and Andrea Dolfin purchased the office.

In addition to the associated public honour, the office of procurator ensured an active role in the political life of Venice: after 1453, it guaranteed a seat in the Senate. Apart from extraordinary embassies to foreign courts, the procurators were also relieved from the obligation incumbent upon all nobles to accept political appointments, including on the Venetian mainland and in the overseas possessions, thus ensuring their presence in the city. (Note: A deliberation of 1305 required that the Great Council specifically authorize a procurator to occupy a seat on any council. Subsequently, in 1388, it was established that only one procurator for each procuracy could hold another government office. But beginning in 1569, the procurators were allowed to serve as Savio Grande. See Da Mosto, L'Archivio di Stato di Venezia…, p. 25.) The position also brought economic and financial influence through the management of vast amounts of capital and of investments in commercial and private real estate, in government bonds, and in securities and deposits. With the exception of the Doge's Palace, the procurators de supra were also specifically responsible for the construction, maintenance, and management of the public buildings around Saint Mark's Square, including the shops, food stalls, and apartments that were rented out as sources of revenue.

== Procuratie Vecchie ==
=== Historical background ===
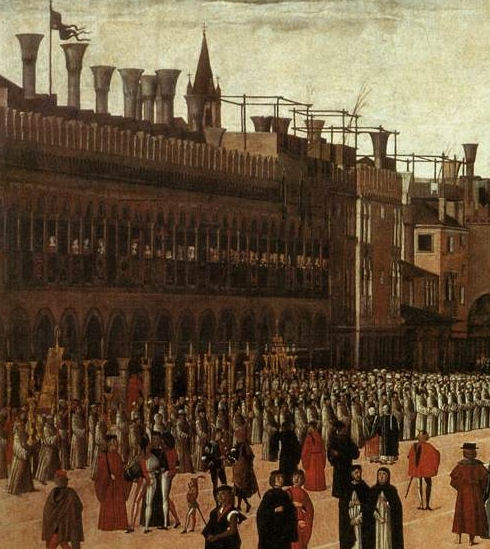
Gentile Bellini, Processione di Corpus Domini in Piazza san Marco (1496). The detail shows the northern side with the twelfth-century building, administered by the procurators de supra, that housed rental apartments and shops.

Following the enlargement of Saint Mark's Square in the second half of the twelfth century, several buildings and lands in and near the square were donated as rental properties to the Commune of Venice, principally by Doge Sebastiano Ziani and his immediate descendants. (Note: Chronicles date the enlargement of the square alternatively to the reigns of Vitale II Michiel (1156–1172) or Sebastiano Ziani (1172–1178). See Agazzi, Platea Sancti Marci…, p. 79.) (Note: The Commune of Venice, rather than the doge, is first mentioned as the representative authority of the State in 1143. See Maranini, La costituzione di Venezia..., I, p. 102.) Subsequently, the administration of many of the properties was delegated to the procurators de supra. (Note: The act is in the State Archives of Venice in PS b. 70, proc. 155, cc. 17–26. See Agazzi, Platea Sancti Marci…, p. 82.) The intention was to create a steady flow of revenue in order to fund further work on the Church of Saint Mark and provide charitable assistance to the poor, thus avoiding the need to rely upon private pious donations and state financing. The properties included the long building erected by Ziani along the northern side of the square. As shown in Gentile Bellini's Processione di Corpus Domini in Piazza san Marco (1496), it was a two-storey building with a series of apartments above and shops on the ground floor that were leased.

A fire in June 1512 destroyed one of the apartments near the clocktower and led to the collapse of a portion of the façade. It was subsequently decided that notwithstanding the financial constraints at the time of the War of the League of Cambrai (1508–1516), the entire structure would be rebuilt as a statement of Venice's self-confidence. Significantly, Marin Sanudo remarked in his diary that the reconstruction was "in order to make it very beautiful for the glory of the land … despite the war" ("farle di novo e bellissime, che sarà onor di la terra … ben sia la guerra").

The architect of the Procuratie Vecchie is not known from any official source, and various names have been suggested, primarily on the basis of stylistic considerations and the prominence of the individual architect at the time. These include Mauro Codussi, Pietro Lombardo, and Antonio Abbondi. (Note: Adolfo Venturi, Giulio Lorenzetti, Luigi Angelini, and Lionello Puppi attribute the design to Mauro Codussi who is generally considered to be the architect of the adjacent clock tower. Paolo D’Ancona and Maria Luisa Gengaro attribute the lower two levels to Codussi and the upper floor to Bartolomeo Bon. But Codussi died in 1504, and there is no indication that the substitution of the previous building was planned prior to the fire of 1512. Pietro Selvatico and Julius Baum consider the design of the lower two levels to be the work of Pietro Lombardo, who at the time was over eighty, and attribute the upper level to Bon. Donatella Calabi also suggests Antonio Abbondi, called “Scarpagnino”, due to the similarity of his work at Rialto after the fire of 1514. See Agazzi, Platea Sancti Marci…, pp. 107-108 and Morresi, Piazza san Marco..., pp. 21-25 and 46 (note 40) for bibliographical references.) With regard to the sixteenth-century sources, Marin Sanudo mentions the little-known Tuscan architect Zuan Celestro in his diary (1514), whereas Francesco Sansovino in his guide to the city (1581) attributes the design to Pietro Bon, the proto (consultant architect and buildings manager) to the procurators de supra. (Note: The name of Bon is confirmed in the witness statement of procurator Melchiorre Michiel in the 1569 case "Proprietà in Campo Russolo". The relative document is in the State Archives of Venice in PS, b. 33, processo 68, fascicolo 2. See Howard, The Architectural History of Venice, p. 129 and Morresi, Piazza san Marco..., p. 87. Howard's text identifies the architect as Bartolomeo Bon since it predates Stefano Mariani's archival research on Pietro Bon, consultant architect and buildings manager for the procurators de supra who was often confused with Bartolomeo Bon, chief consulting architect for the Salt Office. See Mariani, 'Vita e opere dei proti Bon Bartolomeo e Pietro' for relative documentation and the attribution of various projects.) But the precise contributions of Bon and Celestro to the design remain unclear. (Note: Deborah Howard suggests that Bon may have simply followed Celestro’s design. See Howard, The Architectural History of Venice, pp. 129-130. Alternatively, John McAndrew proposes that the layout may be the design of Celestro whereas the façade can be attributed to Bon. See McAndrew, L’architettura veneziana…, p. 420. Both Michela Agazzi and Manfredo Tafuri note that a collaboration between Bon and Celestro also existed at the Great School of San Rocco. But Manuela Morresi suggests that the Tuscan architect involved in the Procuratie Vecchie and the Great School of San Rocco may be two separate individuals. See Agazzi, Platea Sancti Marci…, p. 108, Morresi, Piazza san Marco..., pp. 22–25, and Tafuri, Renovatio Urbis…, pp. 130–131.) Bon, as proto, was nevertheless responsible for oversight during construction.

=== Construction ===
==== Bon's superintendence (ca. 1514–1529) ====
Construction began with the damaged section adjacent to the clock tower and proceeded gradually. To limit the loss of revenue to the procurators, each tenant was evicted only when it became necessary to demolish the apartment in order to continue building. Also, the new shops on the ground floor and apartments above were leased as soon as they were ready. By 1517, the first section had progressed far enough to begin work on the façade with the revetments in Istrian limestone. That same year, the first new apartment was rented out.

With respect to the pre-existing structure, the layout of the new building was altered for the first 24 arcades with the insertion of a small street running parallel to the square. In contrast, the earlier layout, characterized by a series of courtyards, was retained for the remainder of the building, further away from the area damaged by the fire. This indicates that, although documents refer to the demolition of the previous structure, certain parts of it were in fact maintained and reutilized, presumably to minimize costs. (Note: Michela Agazzi specifically notes that a doorway from the previous building was discovered inside a wall of the later construction near the Sottoportego di Corte Maruzzi, confirming that portions of the previous building were not demolished. See Agazzi, Platea Sancti Marci…, p. 108. Manuela Morresi, in contrast, argues that the interruption of the lateral street and the return to the previous layout with the series of courtyards was part of a broader effort on the part of the procurators and the Great Council to requalify Saint Mark's Square and discourage certain commercial activities in order to increase the value of the rental apartments. See Morresi, Piazza san Marco..., pp. 25–35.)

==== Sansovino’s superintendence (1529–1538) ====
Following the death of Pietro Bon in 1529, Jacopo Sansovino, a refugee from the Sack of Rome, was nominated in his place as proto to the procurators de supra. The final eight bays of the Procuratie Vecchie, containing five apartments, and the five bays along the western side of the square (subsequently demolished) were completed under Sansovino's direction.

=== Architecture ===
==== Layout ====
Given financial constraints during the War of the League of Cambrai, innovation was limited to design modifications that were aimed at increasing revenue to the procurators de supra, foremost of which was the addition of a floor to increment the number of rental apartments. Also, the number of workshops and stores on the ground floor was increased by inserting a narrow street behind the row of stores that opened onto the square so that each arcade now corresponded to an individual shop. (Note: The narrow street, Calle del Cappello Nero, extends for only twenty-four arcades after which the previous design of the inner courtyards was preserved. Previously, the stores and workshops behind were accessible through passageways in the square that connected to small, inner courtyards. See Morresi, Piazza san Marco..., p. 85.) On the upper floors, the rooms in the back section, connected by suspended galleries, were destined for servant quarters associated with the principal apartments that looked onto the square.

==== Façade ====
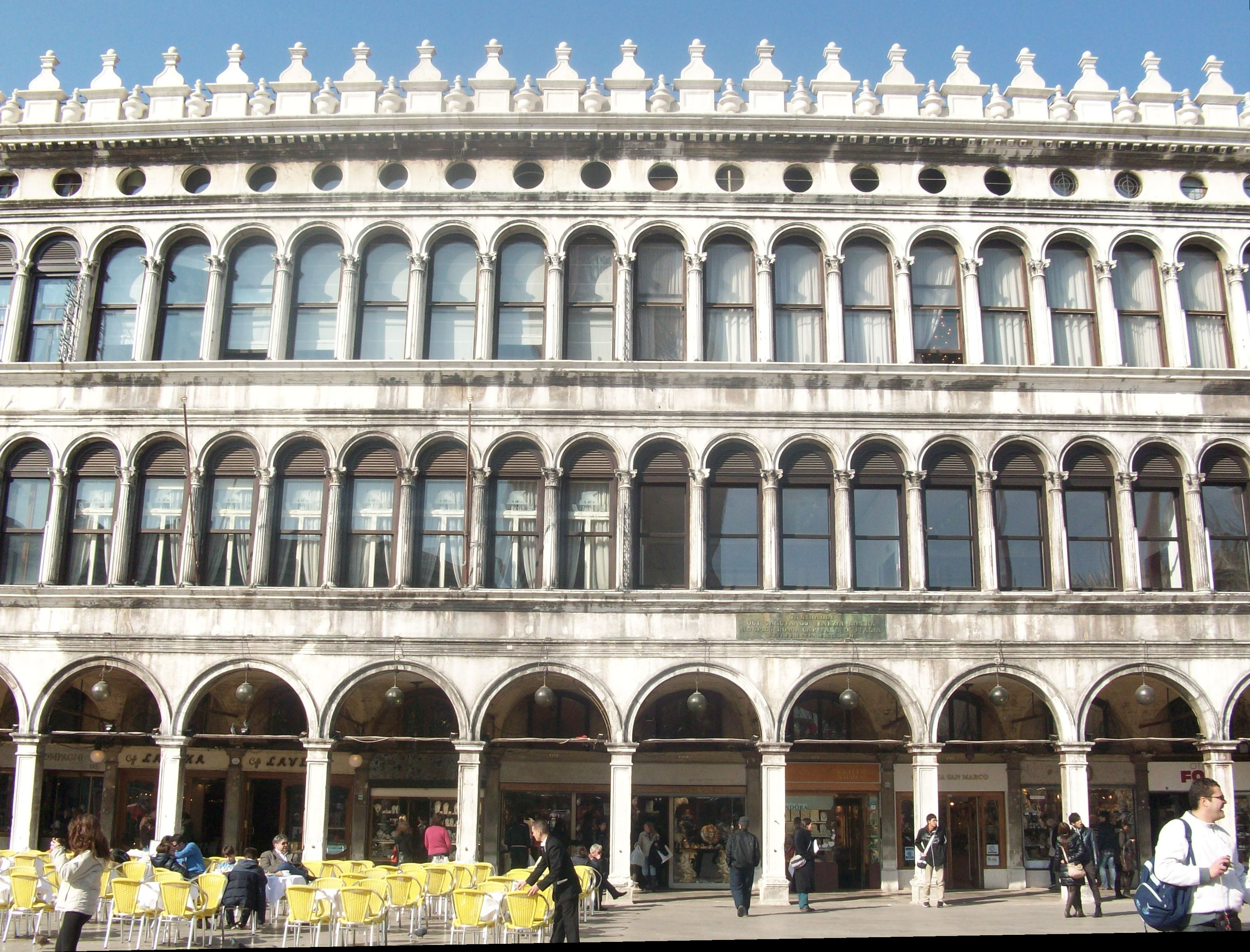
Procuratie Vecchie, detail of the façade

The Procuratie Vecchie was the first major building erected in Venice in emulation of classical prototypes. Although many aspects of the earlier Veneto-Byzantine structure were maintained, including the decorative crenellation along the roofline and the succession of two window bays over each of the ground-floor arches, the elongated stilted arch, characteristic of the Veneto-Byzantine tradition in Venice, was updated with Renaissance semi-circular arches, supported on fluted Corinthian columns. Also, the columns on the ground floor, reminiscent of the Doge's Palace, were replaced with square Doric pillars. This adhered to Leon Battista Alberti's recommendation in his architectural treatise, De re aedificatoria, that in larger structures the column, inherited from Greek architecture, should only support an entablature, whereas the arch, inherited from Roman mural construction, should be supported on square pillars so that the resulting arcade appears to be the residual of "a wall open and discontinued in several places".

=== Later history ===
The Procuratie Vecchie was rental property managed by the procurators de supra for much of its history. At various times, the shops on the ground floor housed a goldsmith, glazier, cobbler, engraver, tailor, spice merchant, painter, cutler, old-clothes seller, barber, bookseller, and notary. In 1638, the 'Rimedio' wine shop opened. It was subsequently purchased by Giorgio Quadri and transformed into Caffè Quadri. Other coffeeshops in the Procuratie Vecchie eventually included 'Re di Francia', 'Abbondanza', 'Pitt l'eroe', 'Orfeo', 'Redentore', 'Coraggio', 'Speranza', and 'Specchi'. 'Alla Regina d'Ungheria', the modern-day Caffè Lavena, opened in 1750.

Due to the enviable site, the rents for the apartments above were relatively expensive, ranging from 40 to 70 ducats a year in 1569. But during the Cretan War (1645–1669) against the Ottoman Empire, it was necessary to sell the apartments in order to raise money to finance the war effort. (Note: The deliberation of the Senate authorizing the sale is dated 15 July 1648. See Mar and others, 'La fabbrica', p. 123.) Although the apartments were later repurchased by the procurators, they were definitively sold in 1717. (Note: The documents relative to the sale and repurchase in the seventeenth century are in the State Archives of Venice in PS, b. 27, proc. 51, fasc. 4. See Talamini, 'Le procuratie vecchie a Venezia…', pp. 16-43 and 61-64. ISSN 0031-1731) Inside the Procuratie Vecchie, several of the apartments were subsequently transformed into small gathering places for entertaining, relaxation, and, at times, gambling. These were termed either casini (little houses) or ridotti (probably derived from redursi meaning to go, typically to a place of meeting or gathering). (Note: It is alternatively suggested that the term derives from redutto, meaning reduced in reference to the practice of closing off sections of apartments in order to create the smaller, more secluded private areas. See Zucchetta, Antichi ridotti veneziani..., p. 19 (note 3).) Most notably, the Procuratie Vecchie housed the 'Casin dei nobili', a large clubhouse for noblemen located on the first floor, and the casino for foreign diplomats, who were not permitted to socialize with the Venetian nobility, located in the wing of the Procuratie Vecchie on the western side of the square. (Note: Another casino for the nobles, the Casino dei Filarmonici, existed on the western side of the square in the wing of the Procuratie Nuove. See Molmenti, 'Lettere inedite del patrizio Pietro Zaguri…', p. 95–96 (note 6).)

== Procuratie Nuove ==
=== Historical background ===
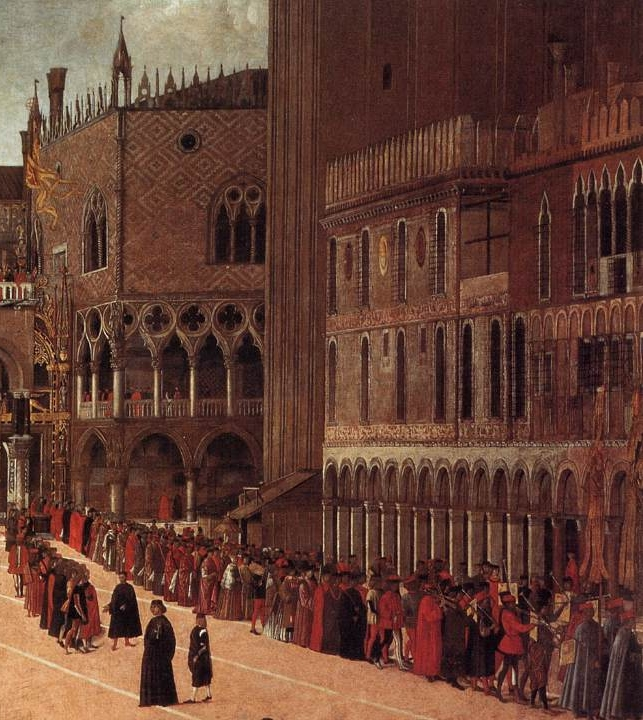
Gentile Bellini, Processione di Corpus Domini in Piazza san Marco (1496). The detail shows the southern side of the square with the timeworn pilgrim hospice (adjacent to the bell tower) and the thirteenth-century residences of the procurators (foreground).

In sharp contrast to the newly built Procuratie Vecchie on the northern side of Saint Mark's Square, the southern side was still lined with several antiquated structures. These included the rent-free apartments erected in the thirteenth century for the procurators as well as their ridotti (offices), which were located inside a separate building dating back to the reign of Pietro I Orseolo (976–978). This building, the Ospizio Orseolo, had originally been constructed as a hospice to give aid and shelter to the pilgrims arriving in the city to venerate the relics of Saint Mark. Later, it served as an almshouse for indigent women.

Conditions in the outdated and precarious apartments were poor, and expenditures for repairs continued to rise for both the occupants and the government. (Note: The excessive repair costs borne by the procurators for their apartments and the misuse of government funds were the subject of a formal inquiry in 1569. The documents relative to the inquiry are in the State Archives of Venice in PS, b. 65 proc. 153 fasc. 1, libretto no. 25. See Howard, Jacopo Sansovino…, p. 14.) (Note: In 1531, the Great Council deliberated to allocate a maximum of 40 ducats to each procurator for modifications and renovations to his official apartment during his tenure. Funds were nevertheless illegally expropriated from other government accounts to finance repairs and improvements. See Morresi, Piazza san Marco..., p.18.) Some procurators, despite the obligation imposed by the Great Council and the Council of Forty, refused to take up residence in the square. Citing the dark and damp conditions and, in some instances, the lack of a view, (Note: The windows on the southern façade looked onto the public granaries.) they preferred to live in their palatial homes elsewhere in the city. Other procurators sublet their official apartments as a source of personal revenue. In addition, there were only six official apartments, two for each of the procuracies (de supra, de citra, and de ultra) which were assigned to the next senior procurator upon vacancy. This number of apartments was insufficient, and the government incurred the additional expense of a rent allowance to enable the remaining procurators to secure living space near the square.

On 14 July 1536, the procurators de supra consequently commissioned Jacopo Sansovino, their proto (consultant architect and buildings manager), to present a model for a three-storey building that was to substitute the hospice and apartments along the entire southern side of the square and continue in front of the Doge's Palace where it was to replace the five hostelries for foreign merchants, the lean-to bread shops, and the meat market. No records survive regarding the ensuing internal discussions, but the project was radically transformed. On 6 March 1537, it was decided that the construction of the new building, now with only two floors, should begin with the section directly in front of the palace and that the space should be destined for the ridotti of the procurators as well as the library, consisting in the precious collection of Greek and Latin manuscripts, entrusted to the care of the procurators, that Cardinal Bessarion had donated to the Republic in 1468 with the request that a library of public utility be founded. (Note: The act of the procurators is in the State Archives of Venice in PS, Atti, reg. 125, c. 2.) There was no further reference to a continuation along the southern side of the square until the 1550s when work was nearing completion on the initial construction stage of the library. At that time, it was suggested that the library be extended to the waterfront and that the entire square be lined with new structures. But no action was taken.

Conditions in the buildings on the southern side of the square continued to deteriorate giving rise to concerns for the dignity of the procurators, and on 10 December 1580, the Senate determined that the time had come to demolish the buildings, citing once again their age and the unsightly appearance. Three designs were submitted for the building that was to house the new apartments of the procurators, and on 5 April 1582, the design of Vincenzo Scamozzi was accepted.

=== Construction ===
Saint Mark's Square in 1581

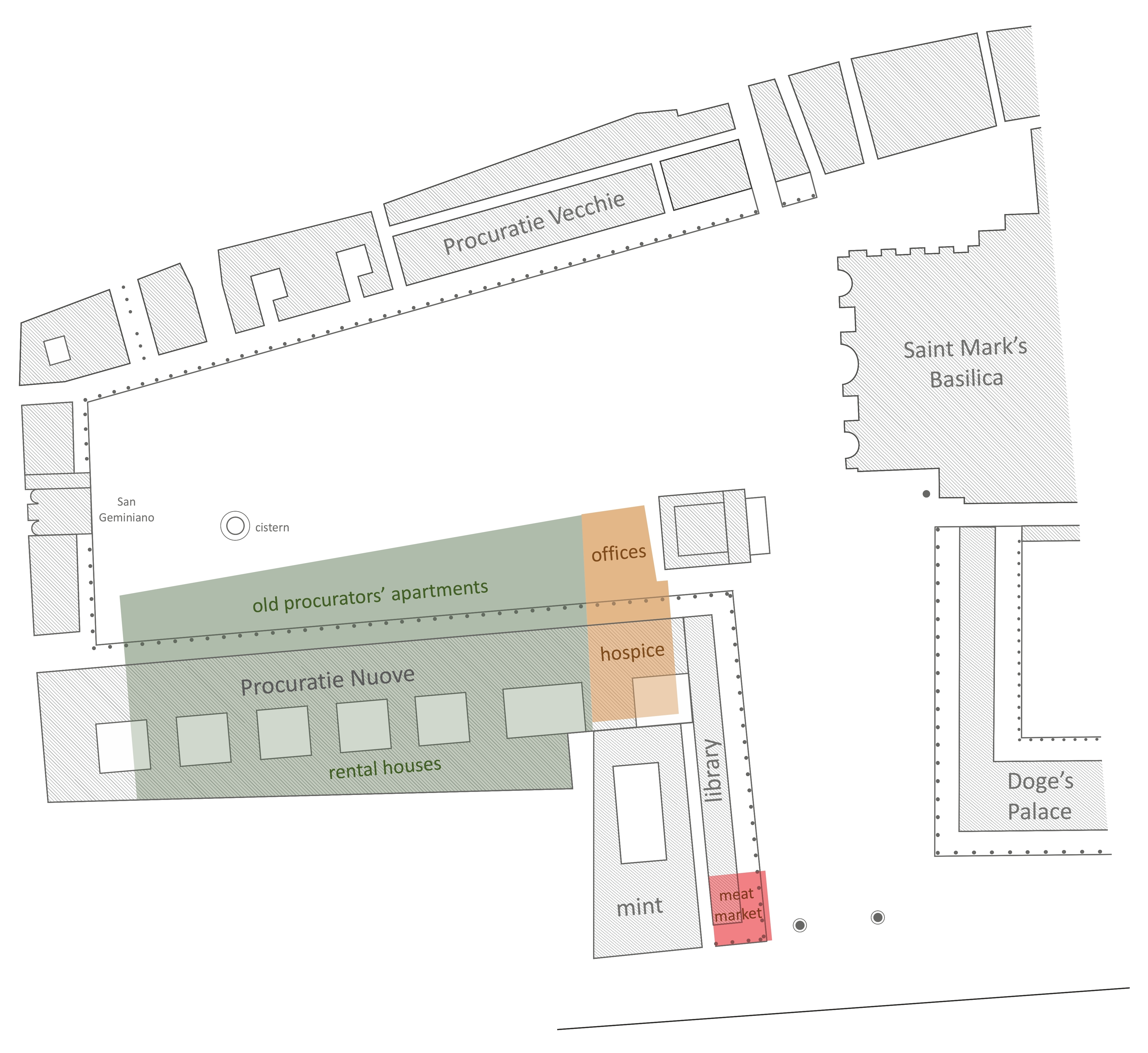
Meat market, demolished in 1581 to continue the construction of the library
Hospice and offices of the procurators, demolished beginning in 1581 to build the Procuratie Nuove
Old apartments of the procurators

The locations have been approximated based on panoramic engravings of the city, land records, and excavations in 1888-1889.

On 15 January 1581, the procurators decided that the new building would be constructed not on the exact site of the hospice and existing apartments but further back, in line with the library. This would make the bell tower a freestanding structure. It would also transform Saint Mark's Square into a trapezoid, giving greater visual importance to the Church of Saint Mark located on the eastern side. Presumably, this had been Sansovino's intention when in 1537 he began the construction of the library further away from the bell tower.

The decision to replace the dilapidated structures with a new building for the procurators was in fact the culmination of the renovatio urbis, the vast architectural programme begun under Doge Andrea Gritti to reaffirm Venice's international prestige after the earlier defeat at Agnadello during the War of the League of Cambrai and the subsequent Peace of Bologna which sanctioned Habsburg hegemony on the Italian Peninsula at the end of the War of the League of Cognac. The programme, which included the mint (begun 1536), the library (begun 1537), and the loggia of the bell tower (begun 1538), called for the radical transformation of Saint Mark's Square from an antiquated medieval town centre with food vendors, money changers, and even latrines into a classical forum. The intent was to evoke the memory of the ancient Roman Republic and, in the aftermath of the Sack of Rome in 1527, to present Venice as Rome's true successor.

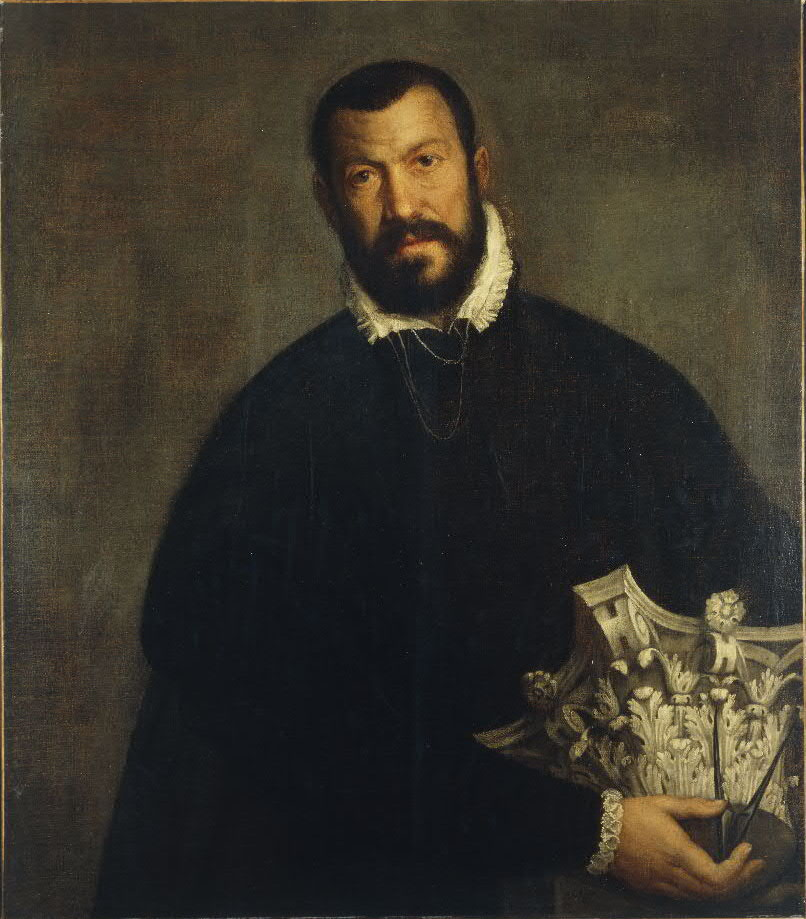
Paolo Veronese, Portrait of Vincenzo Scamozzi (c. 1585)

The building programme was strongly advocated by the papalisti, the wealthy and influential families within the aristocracy who maintained close ties with the Papal court and whose architectural and artistic tastes tended to reflect developments in Rome and central Italy. They saw the transformation of Saint Mark's Square into a classical forum as the means to publicly affirm their own cultural orientation and their superior intellectual understanding of the principles of Ancient Roman architecture as outlined by Vitruvius in De architectura. Economically, the papalisti had largely abandoned maritime trade in favour of the administration of agricultural properties on the mainland. In their foreign policy, they tended to support the interests of the Church and of the Holy Roman Empire. But the building programme was increasingly opposed by the more traditionalist and pro-French faction within the government, the giovani, who resisted the attempts of the papalisti to leave a lasting architectural mark. Hence when after the constitutional crisis of 1582-1583 the giovani found themselves in a position of greater strength vis-à-vis the papalisti, they actively sought to limit any further change to Saint Mark's Square. (Note: The constitution crisis concerned the nomination of the adjunct committee of the Council of Ten and resulted in the reduction of the powers delegated to the Council of Ten and in a renewed legitimacy of the Senate. See Norwich, A History of Venice, pp. 498–501.) (Note: Among the procurators de supra, Antonio Querini, Leonardo Donà, and Andrea Dolfin were strong opponents. See Howard, Venice Disputed..., pp. 178–189 and, in general, Tafuri, Venezia e il Rinascimento..., pp. 261–271.) (Note: For a general discussion of the political factions, alternatively called 'Old' (papalisti or romanisti) and 'New' (giovani), see Lane, Venice a Maritime Republic, pp. 393–395)

Disapproval of the magnitude and grandeur of the project was voiced as early as 1589 when the design was criticized for its rich adornment, considered disparagingly more appropriate to a theatre in reference to Scamozzi's work at the Olympic Theatre in Vicenza. (Note: The remark was by procurator Federico Contarini. See Morolli, 'Vincenzo Scamozzi...', p. 31.) The opposition to the building programme intensified following the death in 1595 of procurator Marcantonio Barbaro, Scamozzi's chief supporter, with radical proposals to demolish the part that had already been completed and erect a structure similar to the Procuratie Vecchie on the northern side of the square. It was alternatively suggested that the project be returned to its original two-floor design. Ultimately, the Senate deliberated that the construction would continue with all three floors. But the design was radically altered, and Scamozzi was dismissed in 1597. (Note: In 1599, Scamozzi was similarly dismissed from the Church of San Nicolò da Tolentino. See Howard, The Architectural History of Venice, p. 174.)

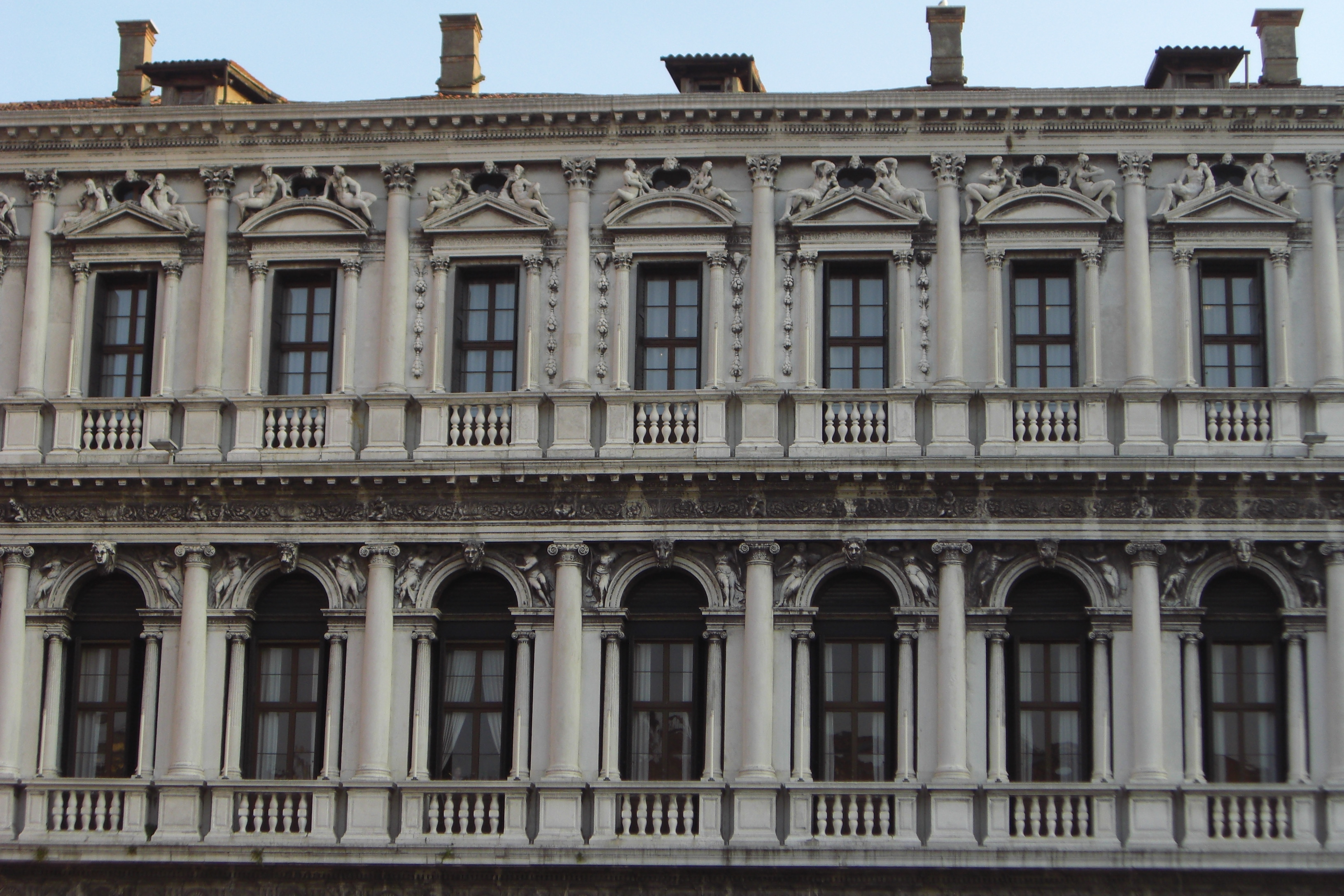
The only apartment unit, eleven arcades wide, built in accordance with Scamozzi's design is characterized by the margents alongside the three central windows.

==== Scamozzi's superintendence (1583–1597) ====
In March 1581, prior to the definitive selection of Scamozzi's design, demolition of the previous structures began with a portion of the old pilgrim hospice and proceeded gradually as more space was required to continue. Actual construction began in 1583. Although Scamozzi was directly involved in every aspect, oversight fell to the proto (chief building consultant) to the procurators de supra, Simone Sorella, whose own design for the new building had been rejected. In 1584, Scamozzi presented further design proposals that included an additional floor. This would allow for separate apartments on each of the upper floors. It was similarly suggested that a floor be added to the library which was nearing completion. But following the equivocal results of engineering surveys conducted to determine whether the existing foundation of the library could bear the additional weight, it was decided in 1588 that the library would remain with only two floors. (Note: Manuela Morresi suggests that in addition to engineering considerations, the decision to retain the height of the library stemmed from the ascendency of the giovani faction in the aftermath of the constitutional crisis of 1582 and its opposition to the aggressive building programme. See Morresi, Jacopo Sansovino, p. 207.) Instead the proposal to raise the height of the Procuratie Nuove was accepted.

==== Later periods of superintendence (1597–ca. 1660) ====
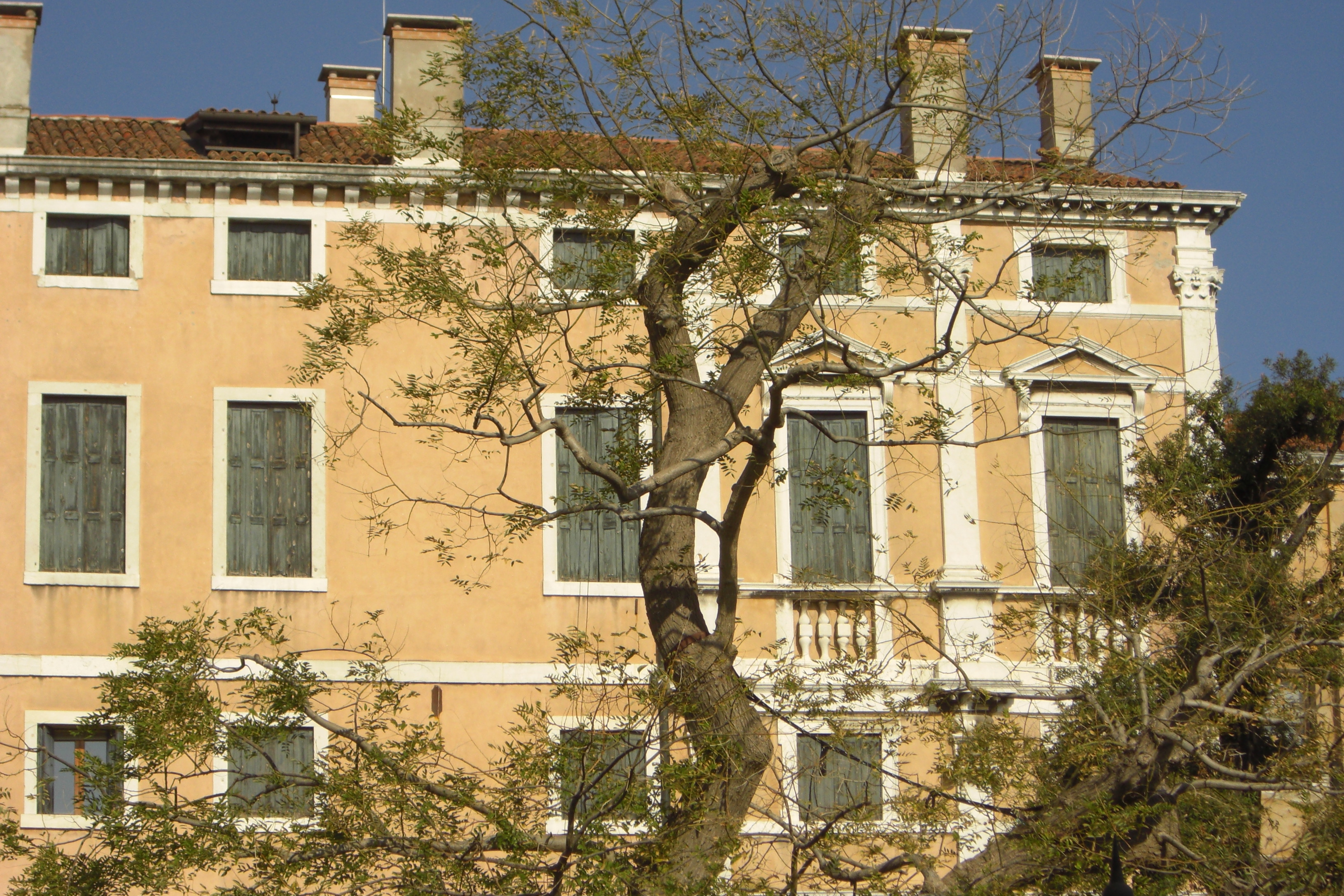
Detail of southern façade, showing the discontinuation of Scamozzi's ornate design.

By the time of Scamozzi's dismissal in 1597, only the first ten arcades had been built. The project was thereafter entrusted to Francesco di Bernardin Smeraldi, called Fracà, who was also nominated proto in 1600 upon the death of Sorella. That same year, the two single-floor apartments already under construction according to Scamozzzi's design were completed, and the first apartment was assigned the following year. Smeraldi then radically reconceived the design as a series of narrower, multi-level apartments. He also simplified the overall decoration. By 1611, the building had reached the twentieth arcade and four apartments were completed. Smeraldi was succeeded as proto by Mario della Carità and subsequently, in 1640, by Baldassare Longhena who completed the construction of the Procuratie Nuove around 1660, including the seven arcades that reached the Church of San Geminiano on the western side of the square.

=== Architecture ===
==== Layout ====
Despite the need to increase the number of apartments available to the procurators, Scamozzi's design was for only six apartments. These were divided into three consecutive units, each eleven arcades wide. The two apartments on the upper floors, one atop the other, shared a single courtyard with staircases and entries onto the square and the canal behind. Each apartment consisted of two sections. The forward section, facing the square, had the principal rooms and a study. It was connected by means of two loggias, running alongside the courtyard, to the back section which had rooms for family members and service areas. Only the first two apartments, begun by Scamozzi, follow this original design. Smeraldi's new design was for narrower apartments, only five arcades wide, that were distributed on multiple floors. Each apartment corresponded to four stores on the ground floor and an archway leading to an inner courtyard that opened to the canal behind. A staircase from the courtyard provided access to the apartment above. By adding another three arcades to the overall project, the number of apartments was increased to seven. An eighth apartment was added on the western end of the square.

==== Façade ====
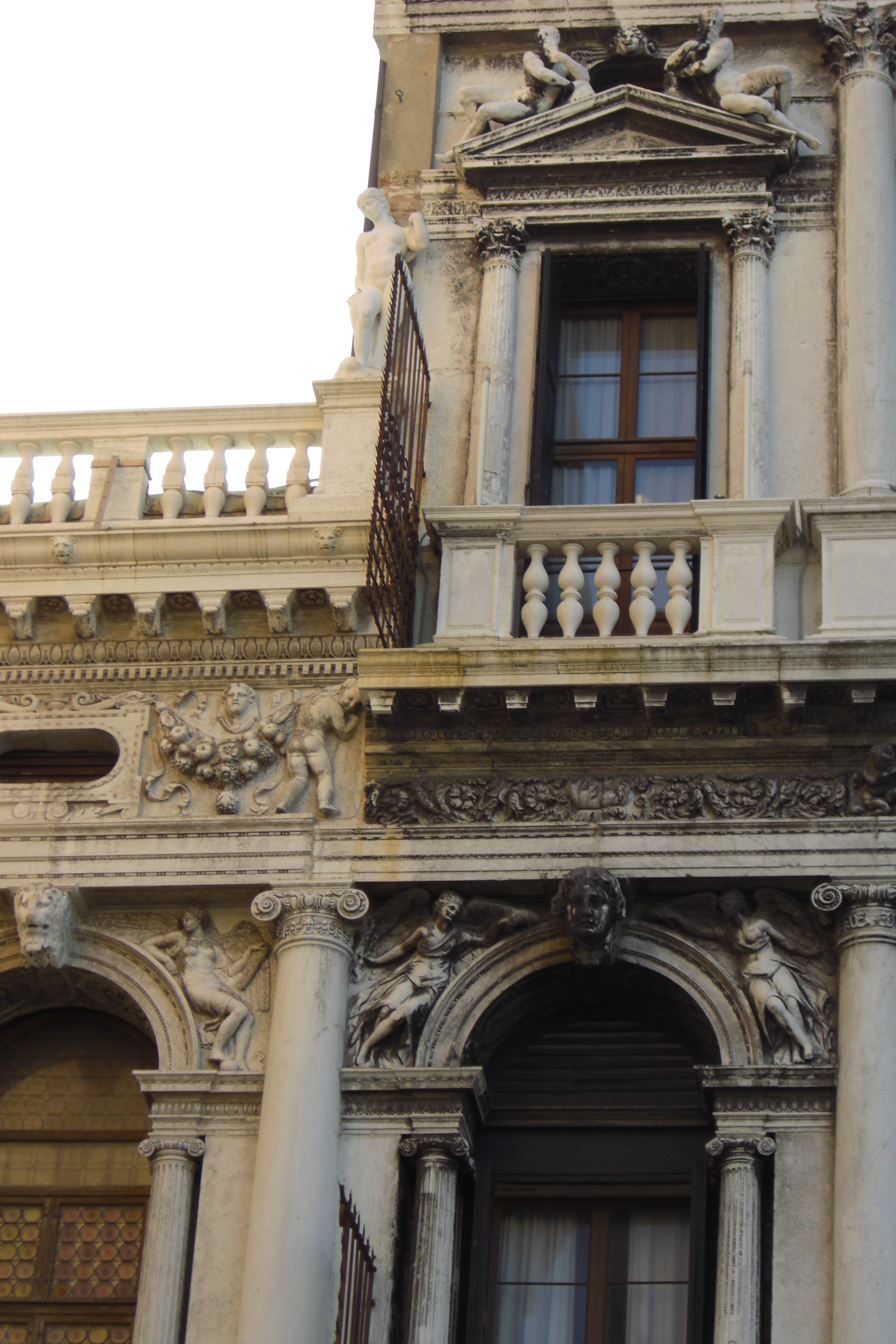
The juncture between the Ionic entablature of Sansovino's library (left) and the 'corrected' entablature of Scamozzi's Procuratie Nuove (right)

For the first two floors, Scamozzi was obliged to continue Sansovino's design for the library. But in his architectural treatise L’Idea dell’Architettura Universale (The Idea of a Universal Architecture), he is highly critical of Sansovino's entablatures, which he states are excessive in height with respect to the columns. The arches are consequently said to be dwarfed and ill-proportioned. (Note: Scamozzi considered appropriate a ratio between the height of the entablature and the column of 1 to 4 for the Doric order and 1 to 5 of the Ionic order, whereas the ratios in the library are 1 to 3 and 1 to 2 respectively. See Scamozzi, L’Idea dell’Architettura Universale, Lib. VI, Cap. VII, pp. 20-21.) In the Procuratie Nuove, Scamozzi, a rigid classicist, corrects the 'error' by reducing the height of the Ionic frieze, without, however, successfully resolving the problem of transitioning between the two buildings.

In Sansovino's library, the ground floor consists in a series of Doric columns, supporting an entablature, that is superimposed on an arcade. The ancient prototypes are the Theatre of Marcellus and the Colosseum in Rome. Similarly, on the upper floor of the library, a row of large Ionic columns is superimposed on a series of Serlians. Scamozzi, while acknowledging the existence of both Roman and Renaissance precedents, was critical of such layering. In his design for the additional floor of the Procuratie Nuove, the series of Corinthian columns rests against a simple wall. As a result, the third level lacks the deep recesses and the strong chiaroscuro effect of the lower floors.

The wall between the Corinthian columns is pierced with rectangular aedicule windows, topped by alternating curvilinear and triangular tympanums. The solution of the alternating tympanums had been employed by both Bramante and Raphael for residential architecture and by Palladio for Palazzo Porto and Palazzo Chiericati. Palladio also proposed the combination in his design for the rebuilding of the Doge's Palace after the fire of 1577, which may have been the immediate source for Scamozzi. The ancient prototype is the Pantheon where the altars alternate around the perimeter, in pairs, with curvilinear and triangular pediments. Scamozzi's design for the upper floor included elaborate carvings and reclining figures atop the tympanums. But these were eliminated from the design by Smeraldi and exist only above the first ten windows, completed during Scamozzi's superintendence.

=== Later history ===
The apartments of the procurators occupied the upper storeys. The shops on the ground floor were rented out as sources of revenue. In 1683, a coffeeshop was present, the sole such establishment in Venice. Thereafter the number of coffeeshops in the Procuratie Nuove increased and eventually included 'L’Angelo Custode', 'Duca di Toscana', 'Buon Genio', 'Doge', 'Imperatore', 'Imperatrice delle Russie', 'Tamerlano', 'Fortuna', 'Diana', 'Dama Veneta', 'Aurora', 'Piastrelle', 'Pace', and 'Arabo'. The historic Caffè Florian, initially named 'Venezia Trionfante', opened in 1720.

After the fall of the Republic of Venice to Napoleon, the Procuratie Nuove was adapted to serve as the official residence of Eugène de Beauharnais, the viceroy of the Napoleonic Kingdom of Italy, during the second period of French domination (1805–1815). The former apartments of the procurators were decorated by Giovanni Battista Canal and Giuseppe Borsato between 1807 and 1813, under the influence of the French decorator Charles Percier who was in Venice in 1807. For the decoration of the throne room and the dining room, Pietro Moro and Sebastiano Santi were also involved. Giovanni Carlo Bevilacqua collaborated in other rooms. Modifications were also made in 1834–1836 and 1853–1857, during the subsequent period of Austrian domination (1815–1866), when the Procuratie Nuove served as an imperial residence. After the annexation of Venice to the Kingdom of Italy, the Procuratie Nuove came into the possession of the Italian Crown which ceded ownership to the State in 1919. Since 1922, the building houses the Correr Museum.

== Ridotti of the procurators ==
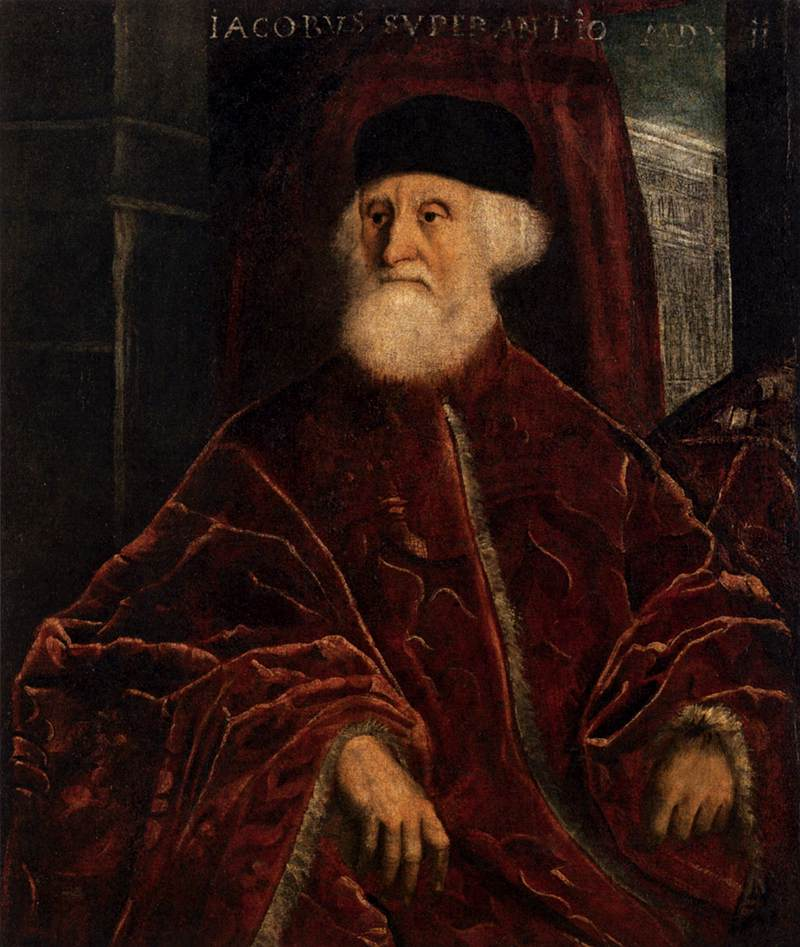
Tintoretto, Portrait of Jacopo Soranzo (1550). The portrait of Soranzo, elected procurator of Saint Mark de supra in 1522, hung in the ridotti of the procurators.

The offices of the procurators, called ridotti, were originally located in the section of the old pilgrim hospice that directly faced Saint Mark's Square. In 1591, after the completion of the final five bays of the library by Vincenzo Scamozzi (1588), the offices were moved to the upper floor of the new library building when the remaining section of the hospice was demolished in order to continue the construction of the Procuratie Nuove.

Ridotti of the procurators
on the upper floor of the Library

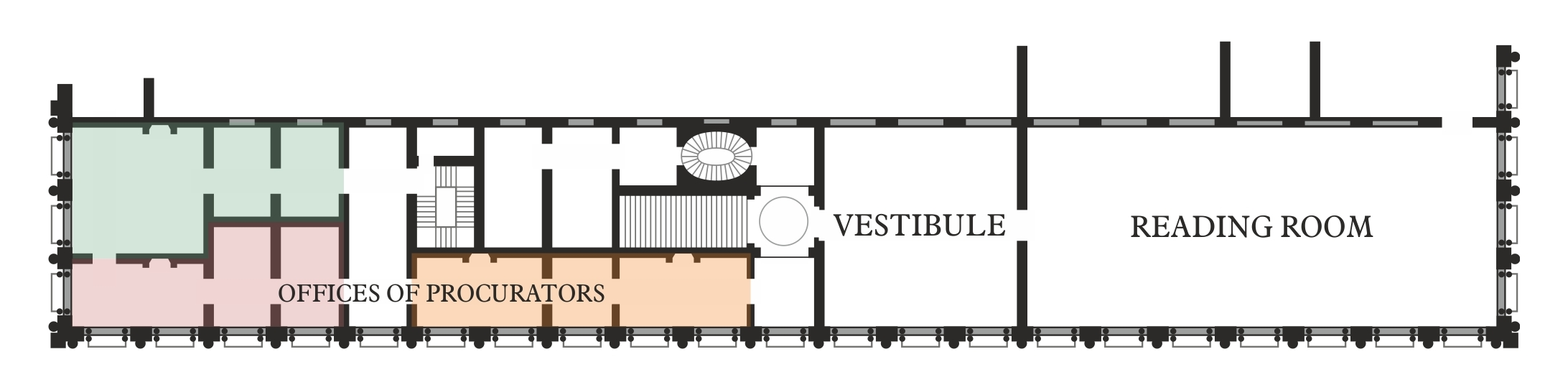
procurators de supra
procurators de citra
procurators de ultra

The offices of the procurators de supra were located in the portion of the library completed earlier by Sansovino, directly facing the Piazzetta and the Doge's Palace, whereas the offices of the procurators de citra and de ultra were situated in the area built by Scamozzi. Curiously, in 1552 when the library was still under construction, the practice began of extracting by lot the use of the balconies by the procurators and their guests to observe the carnival celebrations in the Piazzetta. The designated area for the offices, accessible by means of the same entry as the library, consisted in nine rooms, three for each of the procuracies. The rooms utilized by the procurators de supra were prominently positioned at the top of the monumental staircase as an indication of their prestige. The first of the rooms served as an archive for documents, the second as a room for administrative officials and clerks in attendance, the third for plenary meetings. Paintings, primarily portraits of the procurators and devotional works, were transferred from the previous offices and adapted to the new rooms by Tintoretto, under the direction of Scamozzi. In the offices of the procurators de supra, the portraits were hung in double rows, the meeting room being reserved for the portraits of the procurators who had subsequently been elected as doges. Following the fall of the Republic of Venice, the art collection of the ridotti was removed and in part dispersed when the library was annexed to the Procuratie Nuove as the royal apartment for Eugène de Beauharnais, the viceroy of the Napoleonic Kingdom of Italy. The former ridotti were decorated by Felice Giani between 1807 and 1808 with neoclassical motifs, allegorical figures, and mythological scenes that exalt moral and intellectual virtues.

== Procuratie Nuovissime (Napoleonic Wing) ==
=== Historical background ===
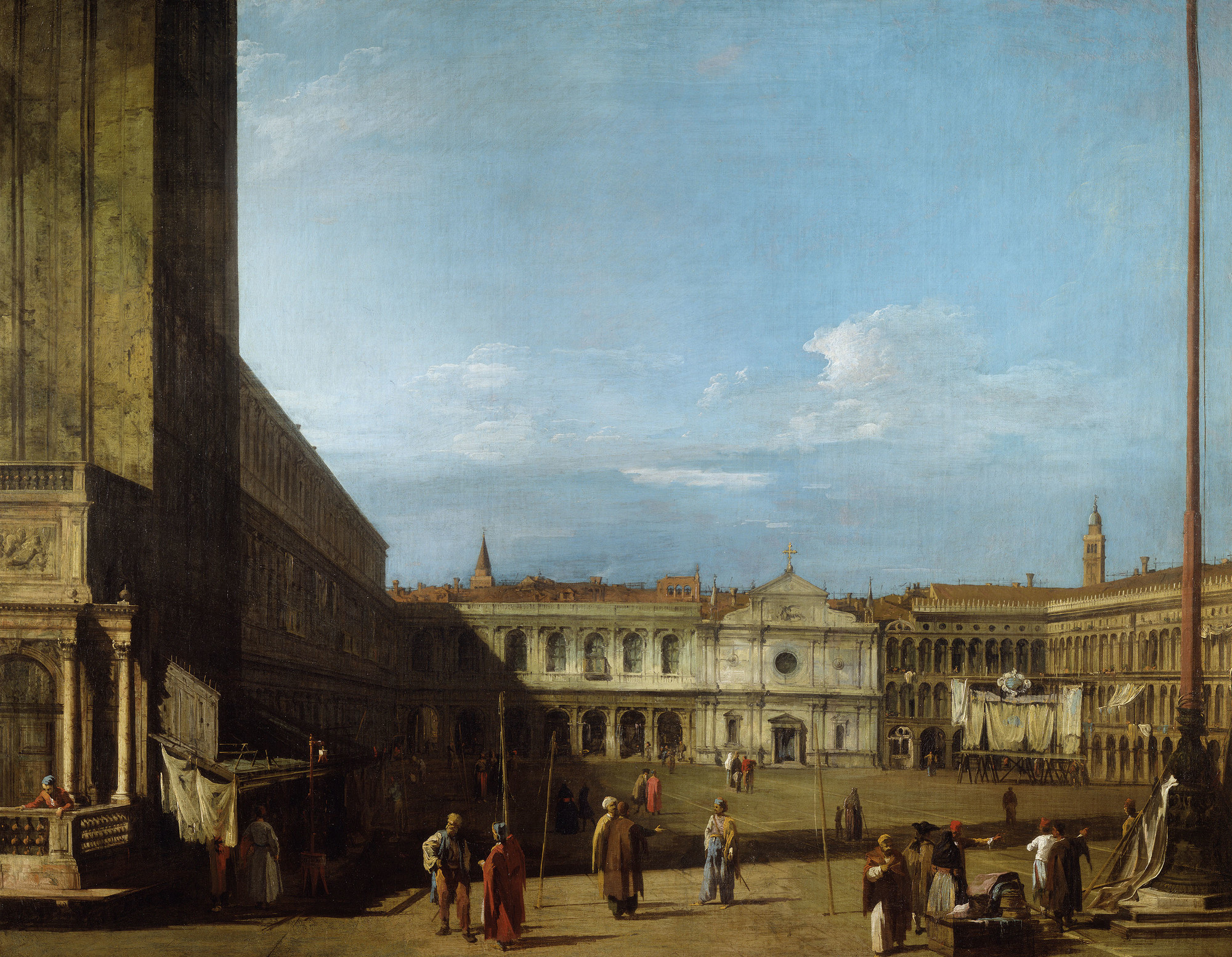
Canaletto, Piazza san Marco looking West towards San Geminiano (c.1723–1724)

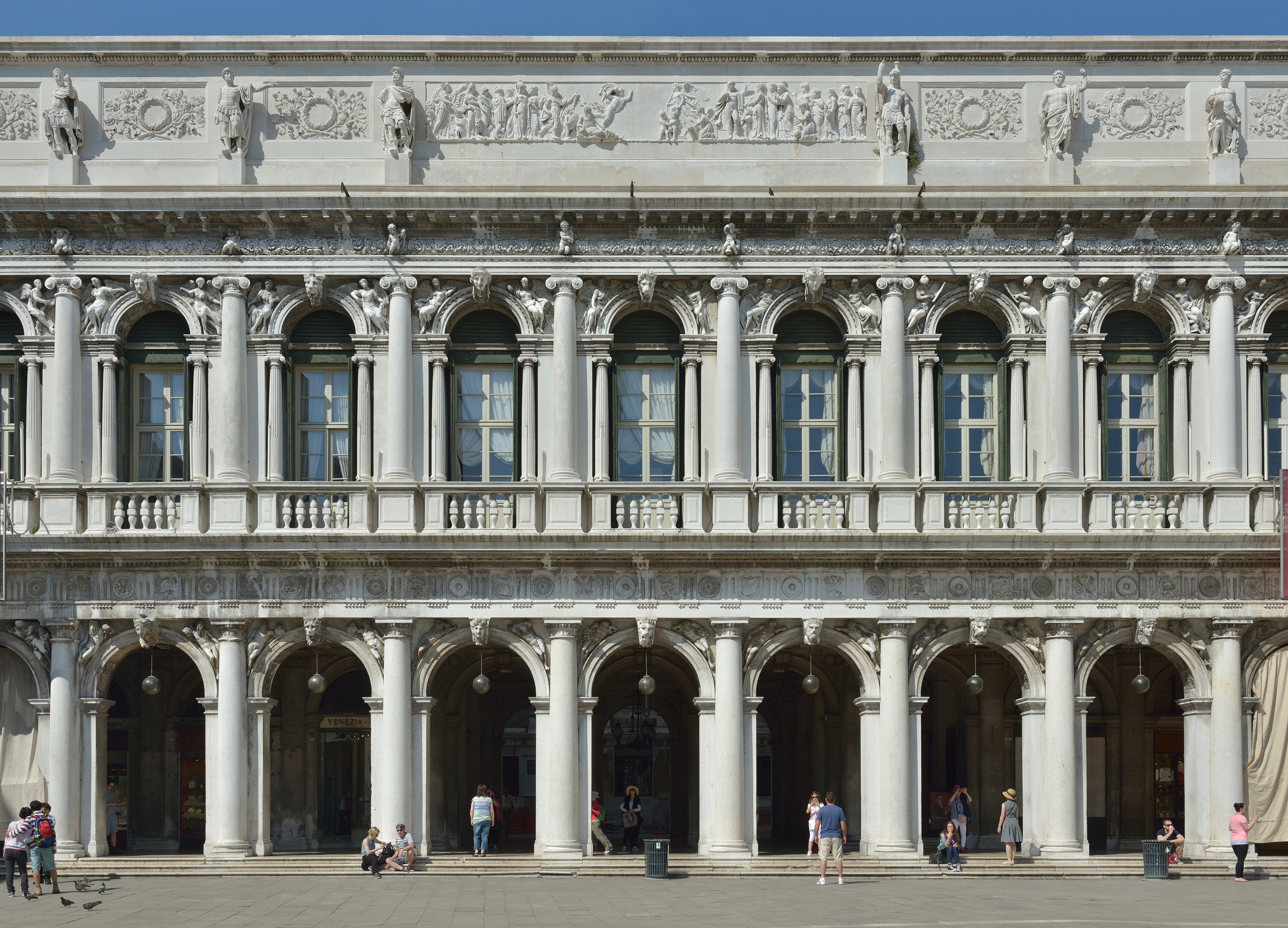
Procuratie Nuovissime (Napoleonic Wing), detail of the façade

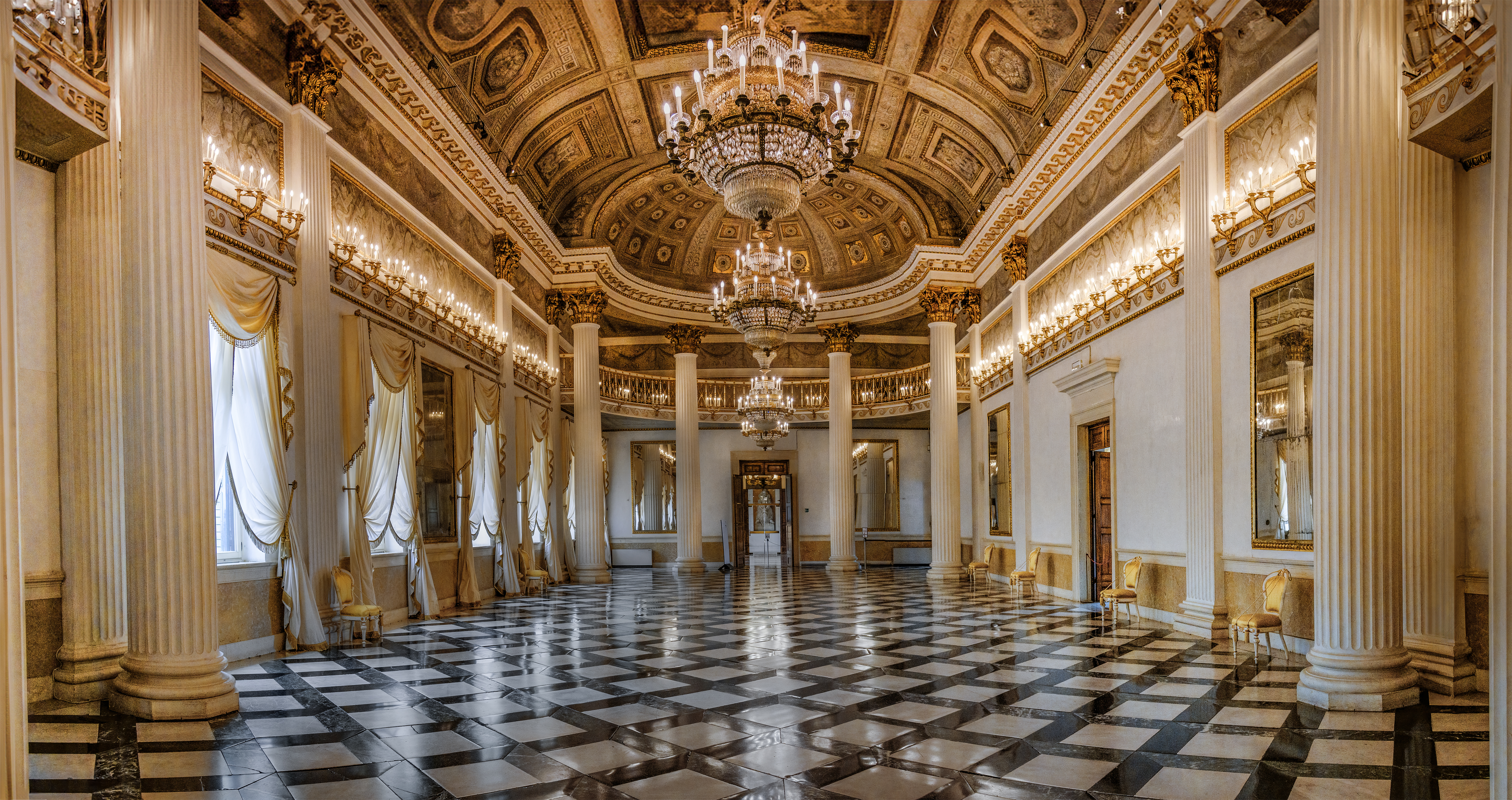
Ballroom completed by Giovanni Santi

When during the second period of French domination the Procuratie Nuove was transformed into a royal residence, the former apartments of the procurators were adapted for residential purposes. But the structure lacked a suitably grand entry as well as larger rooms for audiences and entertaining. In 1807, the Church of San Geminiano, located on the western side of the square, was consequently demolished to have the space needed to extend the royal residence and create the necessary rooms. The church, dating back to the reign of Sebastiano Ziani (1172–1178), had been rebuilt in the early sixteenth century by Cristoforo da Legname and then completed by Jacopo Sansovino in 1557 with the addition of a dome and the façade. It was flanked on both sides by the wings of the Procuratie Vecchie and the Procuratie Nuove, built respectively by Sansovino and Longhena.

Proposals for the building that was to replace the church and join the wing of the Procuratie Vecchie with the wing of the Procuratie Nuove varied. Although the imperial French government sought a sense of monumentality, the projects of Grazioso Buttacalice for a triumphal arch and of Gaetano Pinali for a Corinthian portico were both deemed too radical and equally incongruous with the overall aspect of Saint Mark's Square. Giovanni Antonio Antolini’s more modest design for a two-storey loggia with a grand staircase in the rear was accepted.

=== Construction ===
In 1810, Antolini's project was abandoned and the section of the building already constructed was demolished. The wing of the Procuratie Vecchie was also demolished and replaced by the actual building, designed by Giuseppe Maria Soli, professor of Architecture at the University of Modena, in a Neoclassical manner.

=== Architecture ===
The first two floors of the Napoleonic Wing continue the repeatable bays of Sansovino's design for the library which Scamozzi had also used for the Procuratie Nuove on the southern side of the square. To then visually link the new building to the northern side, Soli designed an attic floor, the height of which corresponds to the roofline crenellation of the Procuratie Vecchie. The attic was also conceived as a means of concealing the high, vaulted ceiling of the ballroom behind.

The façade of the attic is covered in low relief panels with classical motifs. Interspersed with these reliefs are freestanding statues on pedestals by Antonio Bosa and Domenico Banti. These portray heroes, statesmen, and rulers, primarily from Antiquity, that were seen as embodying Napoleonic ideals. The statue in the centre, depicting Napoleon enthroned as Jupiter, was removed during the second period of Austrian domination. Similarly, the decorations in the staircase with the triumphs of Napoleon were replaced.
