= Caffè Quadri =

Coffeehouse in Venice, Italy

Coordinates: 45.43442°N 12.33806°E

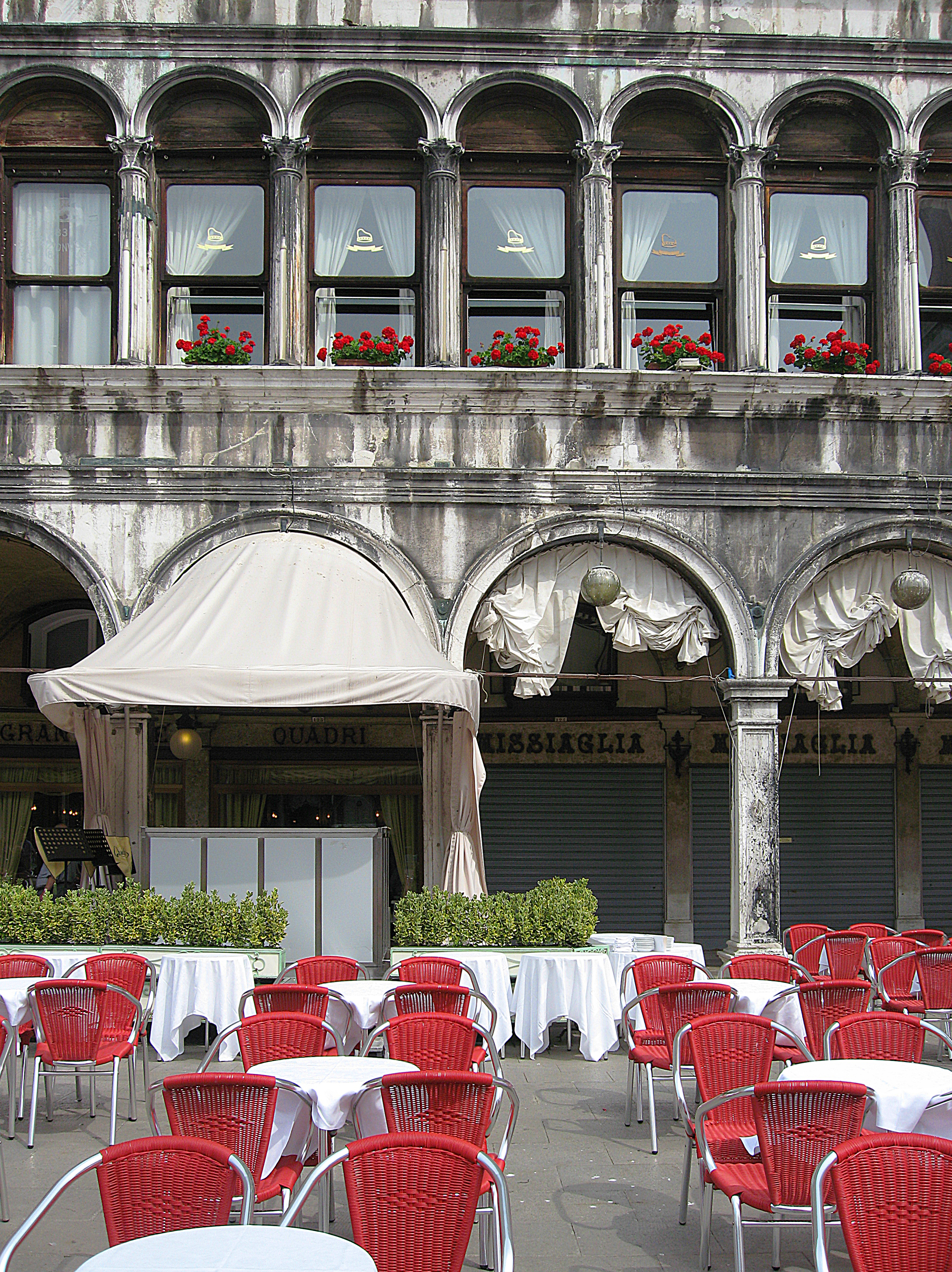
- Interactive map of Caffè Quadri

Restaurant information
- Established: 1775
- Owner: Valery Gergiev
- Location: Procuratie Vecchie, Piazza San Marco, Venice, Italy

Caffè Quadri (Italian pronunciation: [kafˌfɛ kˈkwaːdri]) is a coffeehouse located in the Procuratie Vecchie of Piazza San Marco, Venice. It was established in 1775.

The restaurant underwent a first important renovation in 1830, under the management of the Vaerini brothers, who expanded both the spaces and the activities, purchasing the upper floor that was used as a restaurant. The ground floor was decorated with pastel stuccos, with a prevalence of green and yellow colors, and completed with views and scenes of Venetian life, the work of the painter Giuseppe Ponga, inspired by the style of Pietro Longhi.

The property together with some other shops here are owned by Russian conductor Valery Gergiev as a part of the vast real estate inheritance of the philanthropist Yoko Nagae Ceschina who has died in 2015.
