= Royal Palace of Venice =

Royal Palace of Venice, Italy

Coordinates: 45.4335°N 12.3382°E

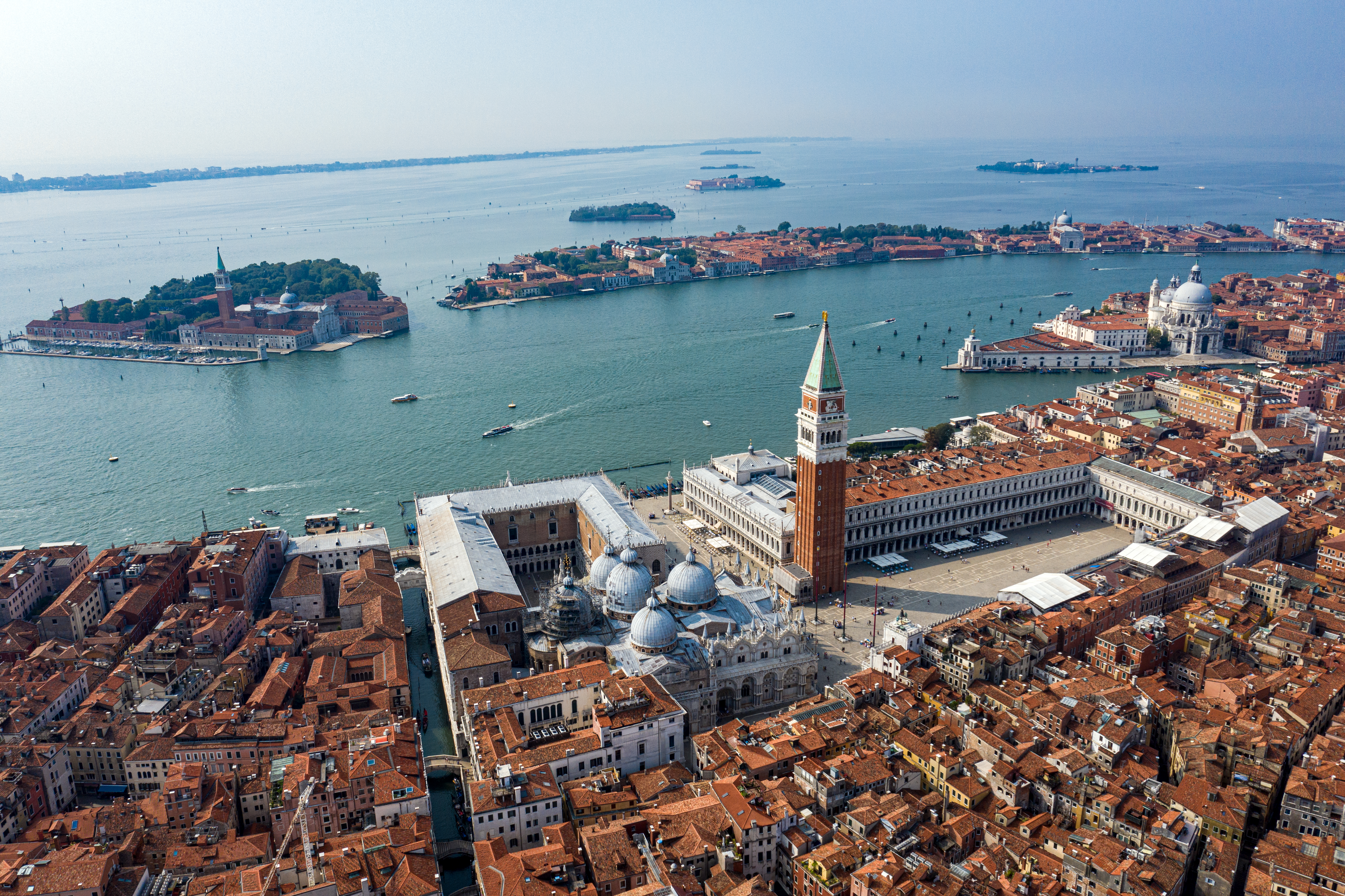
The St Mark's Square with the Royal Palace of Venice behind the Campanile

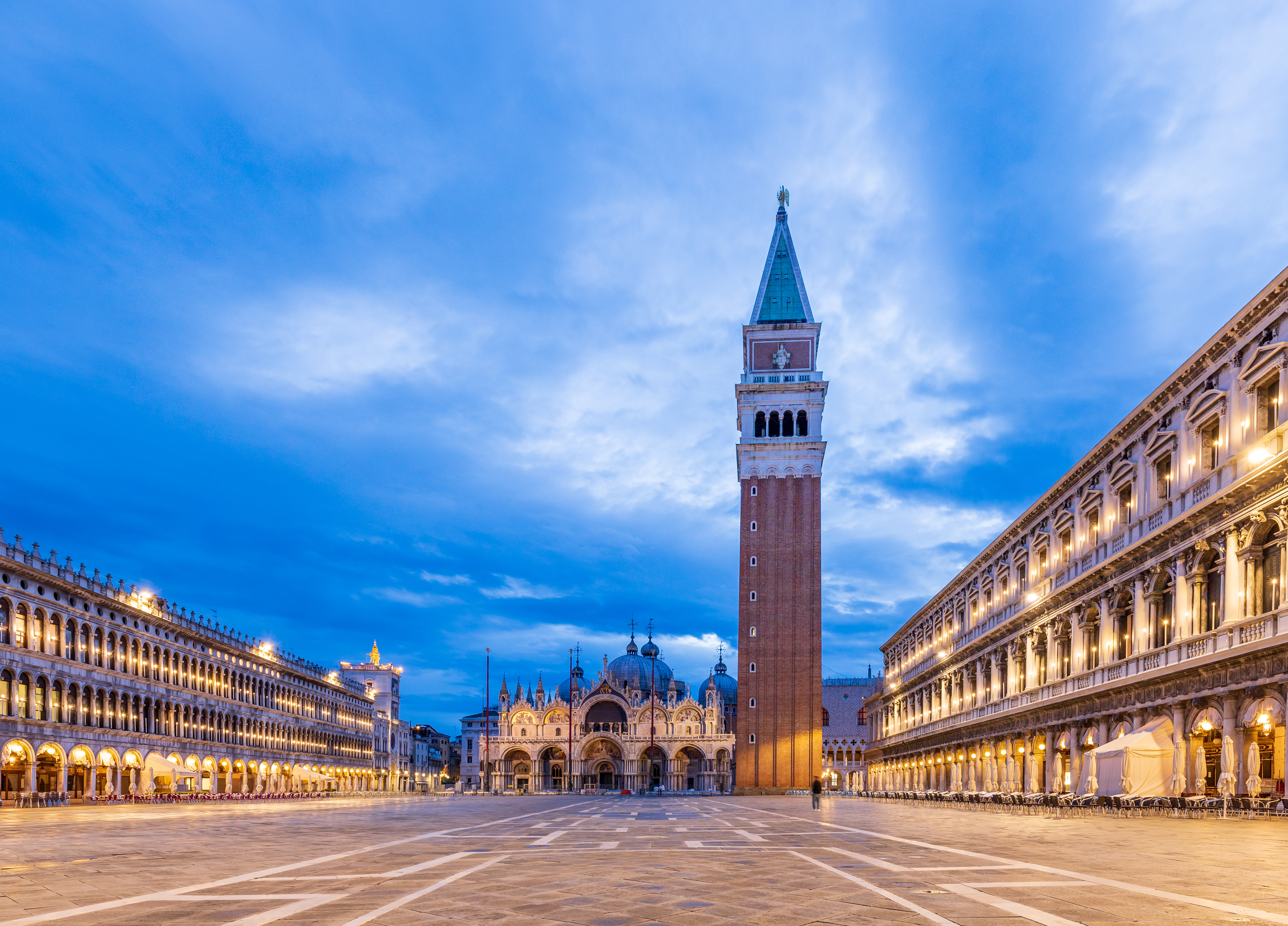
The Royal Palace of Venice on the right

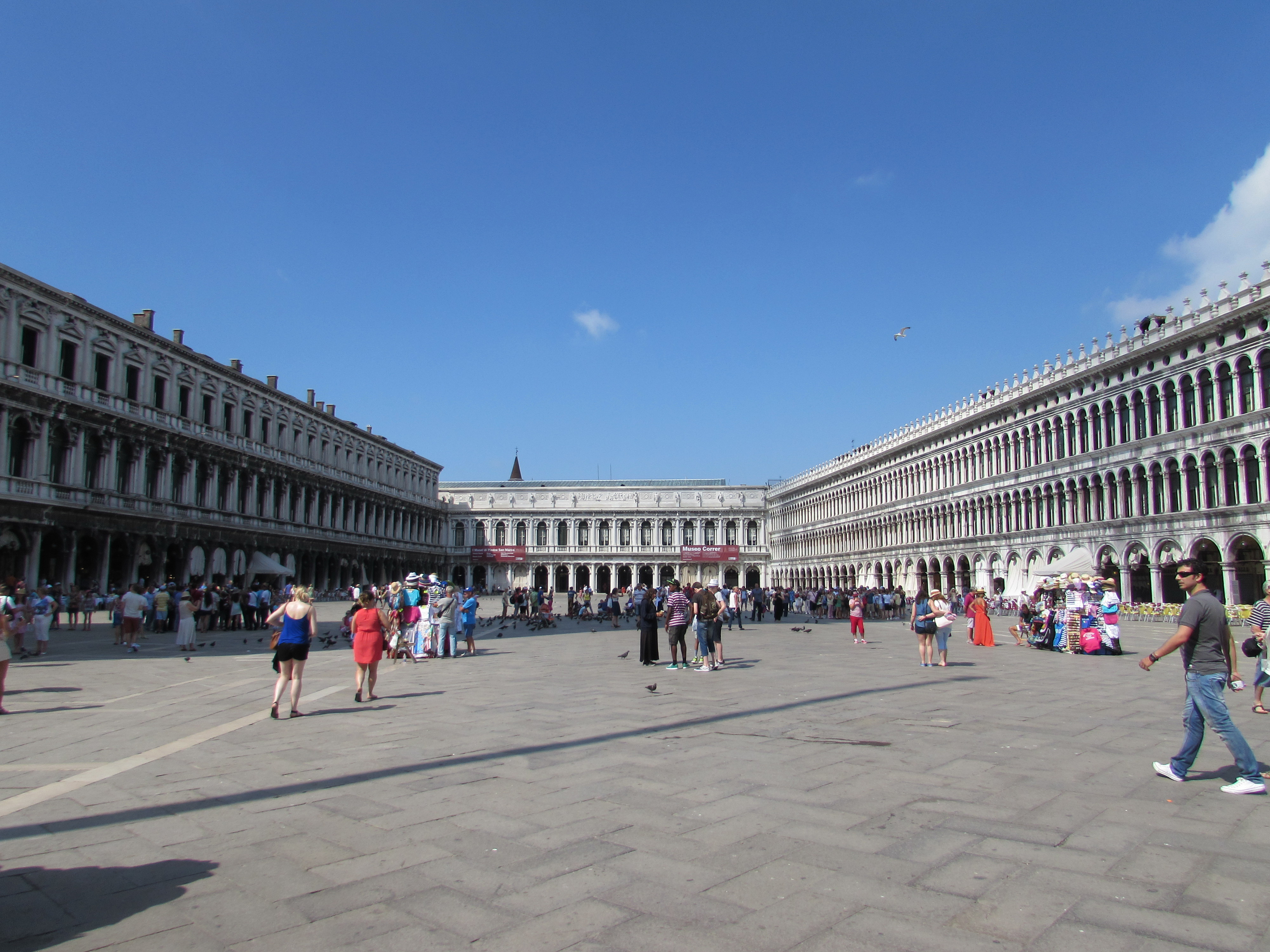
The Royal Palace of Venice on the left

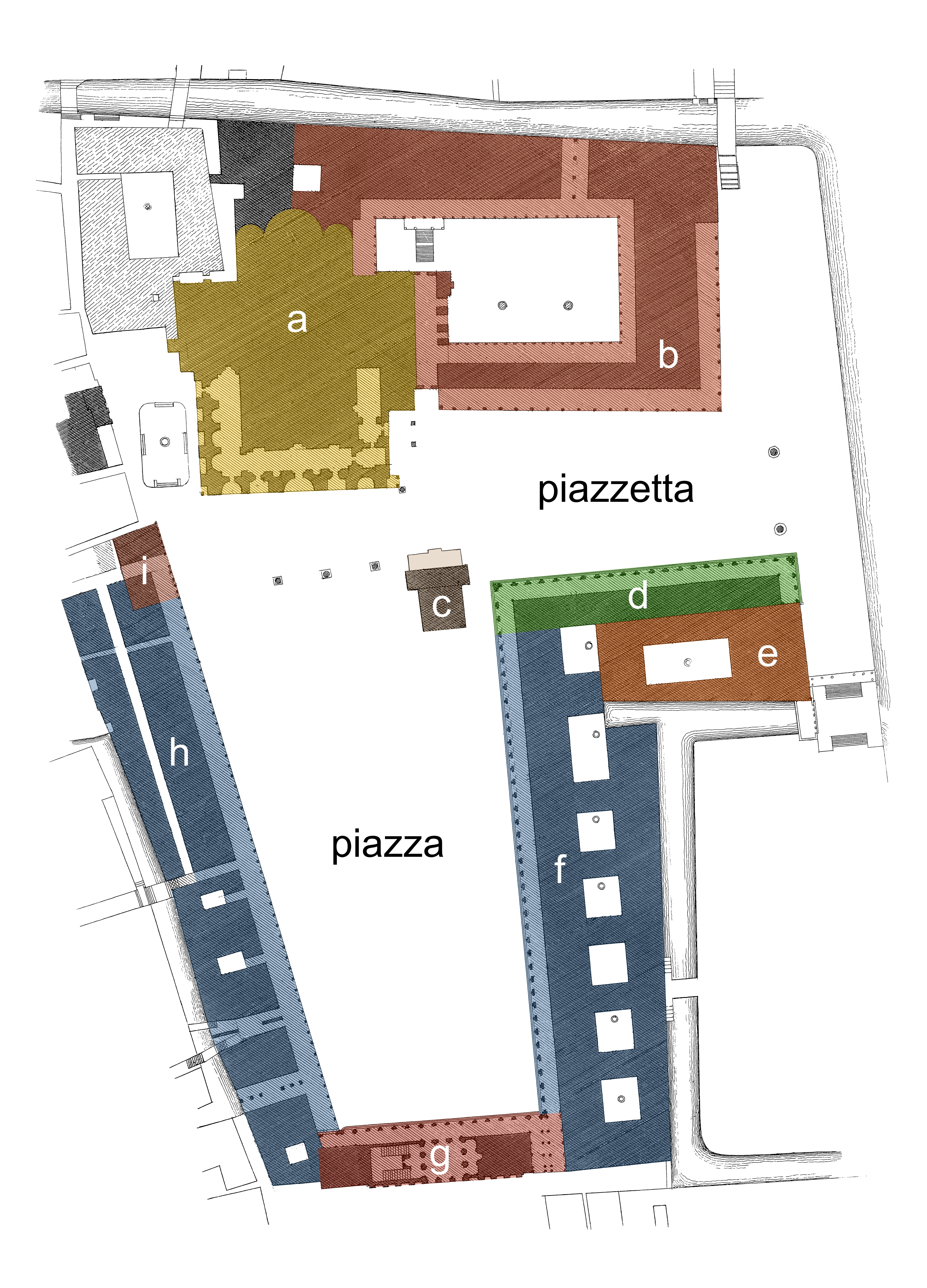
Map of the St Mark's Square, the Royal Palace is located in buildings d (Marciana Library), f (Procuratie Nuove), and g (Procuratie Nuovissime)

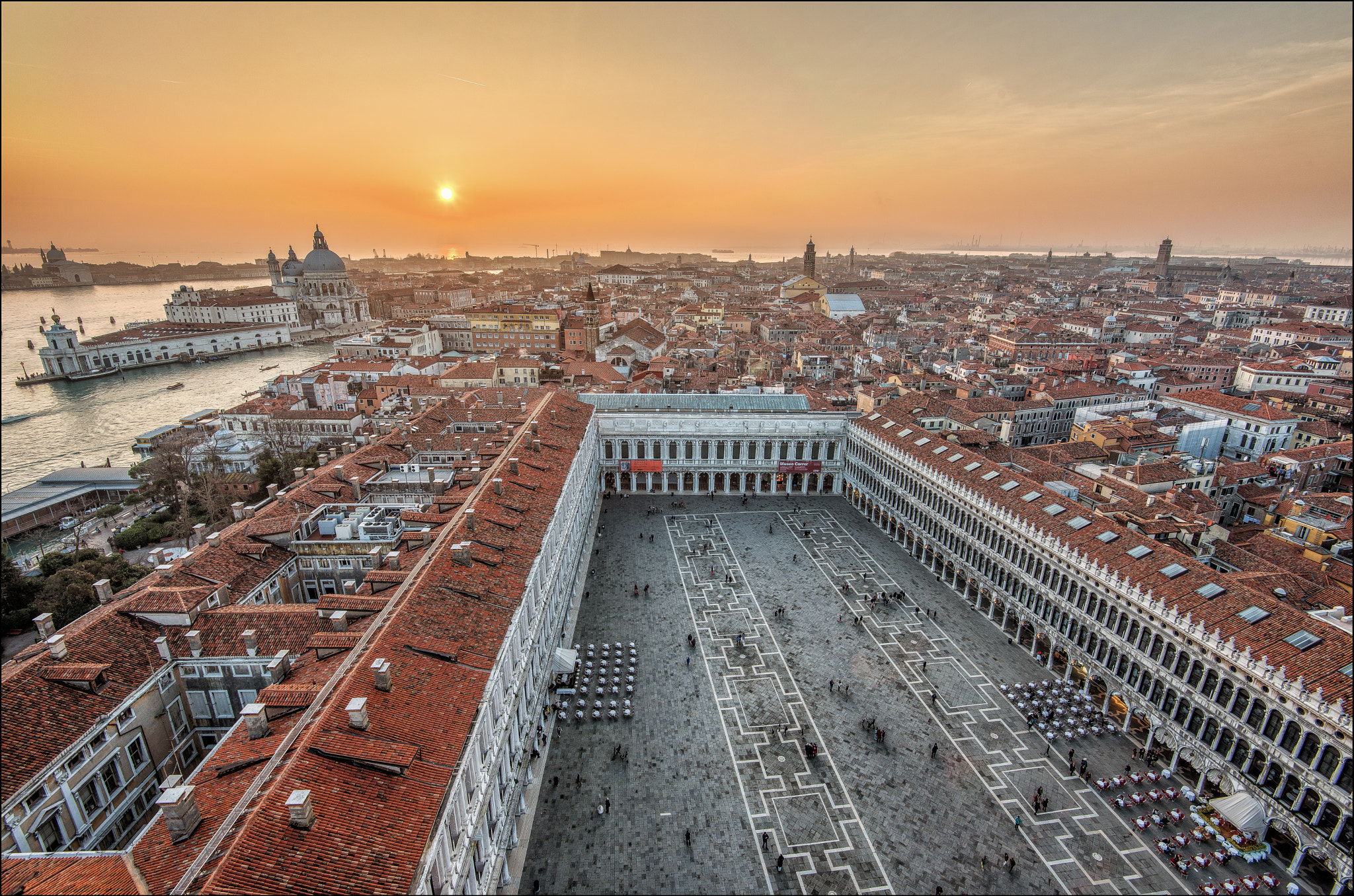
A view from above of the St Mark's Square with the Royal Palace on the left

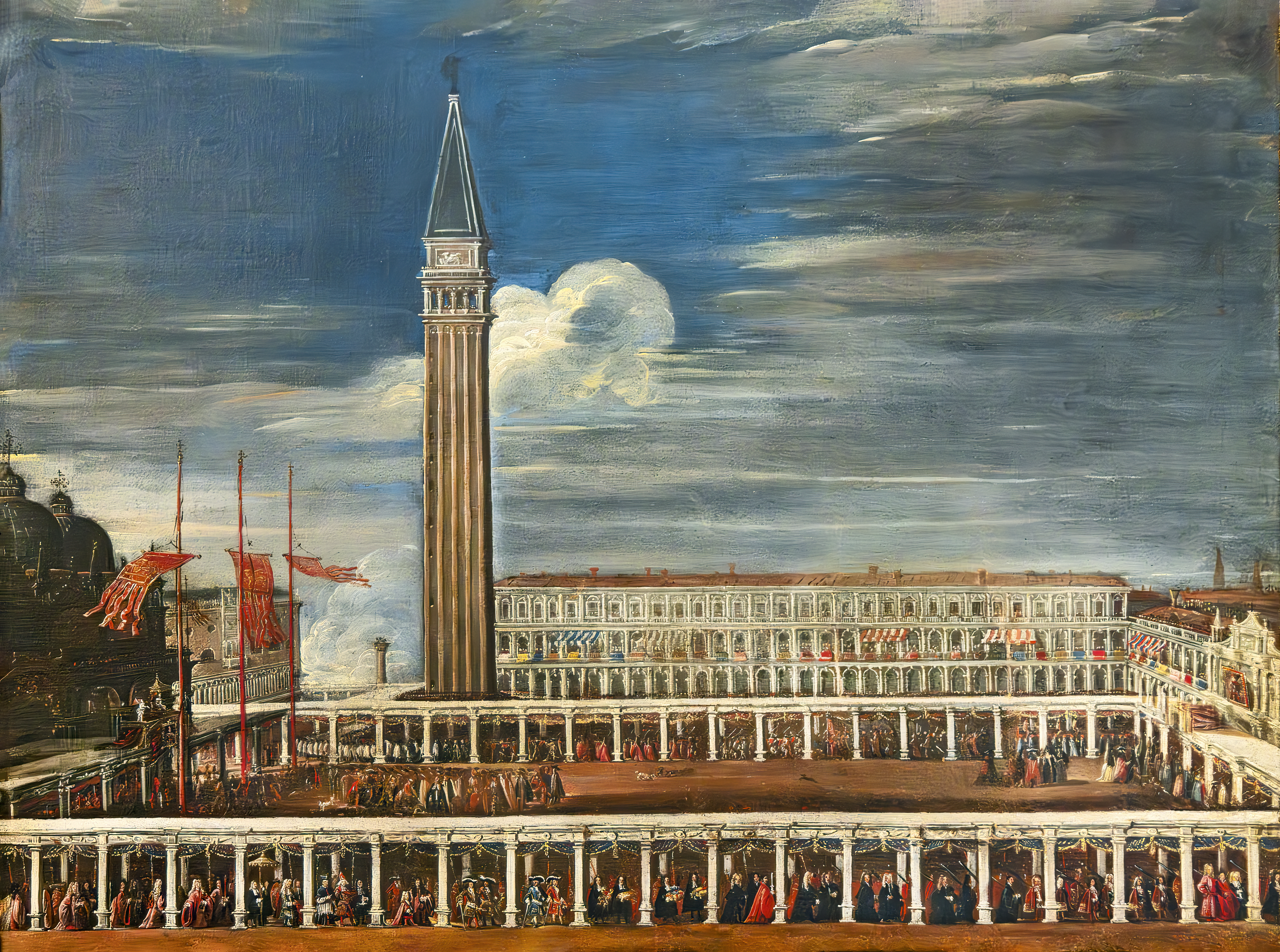
View of the Procuratie Novie with the St Marks Campanile

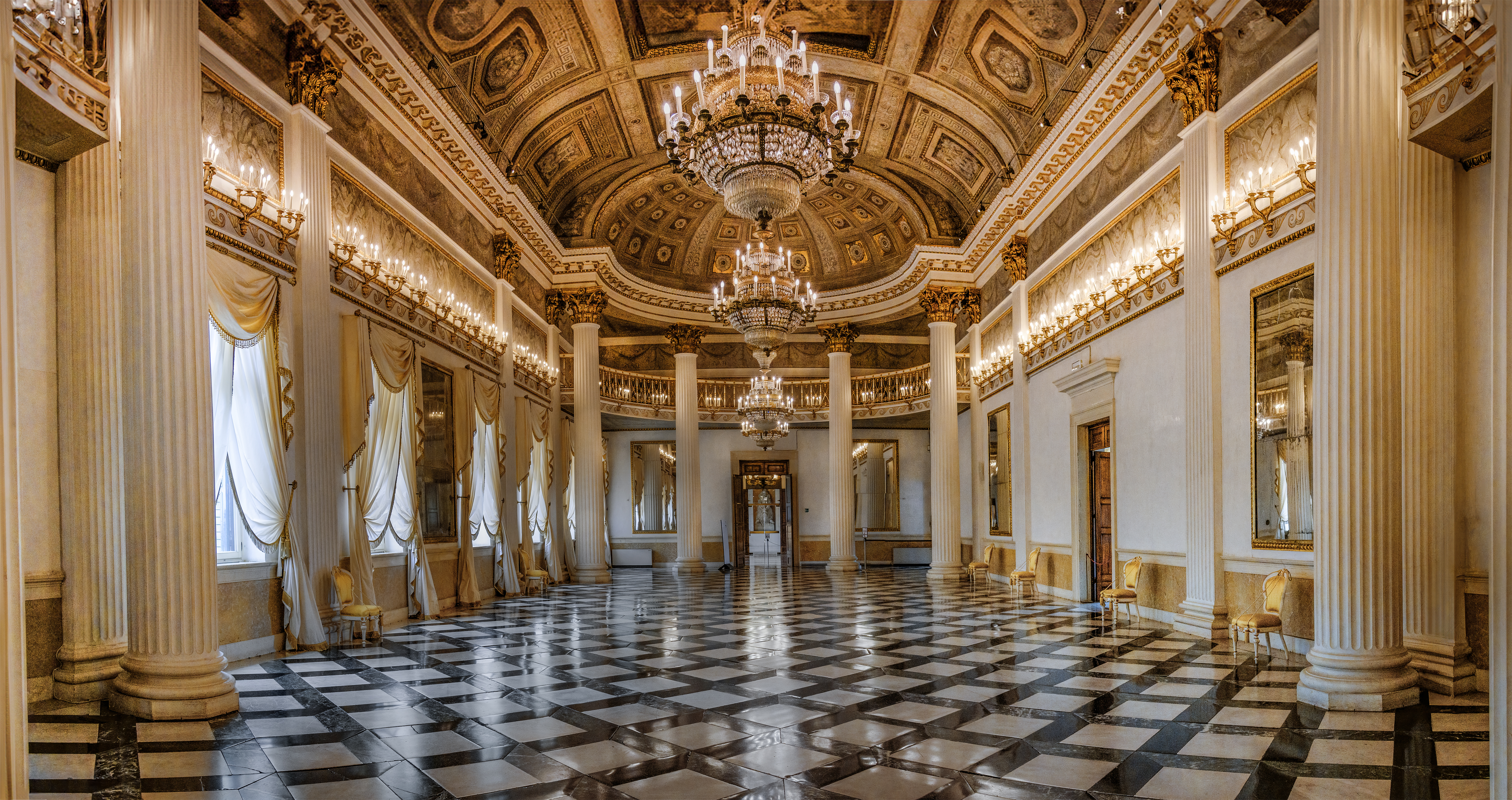
The Ball room

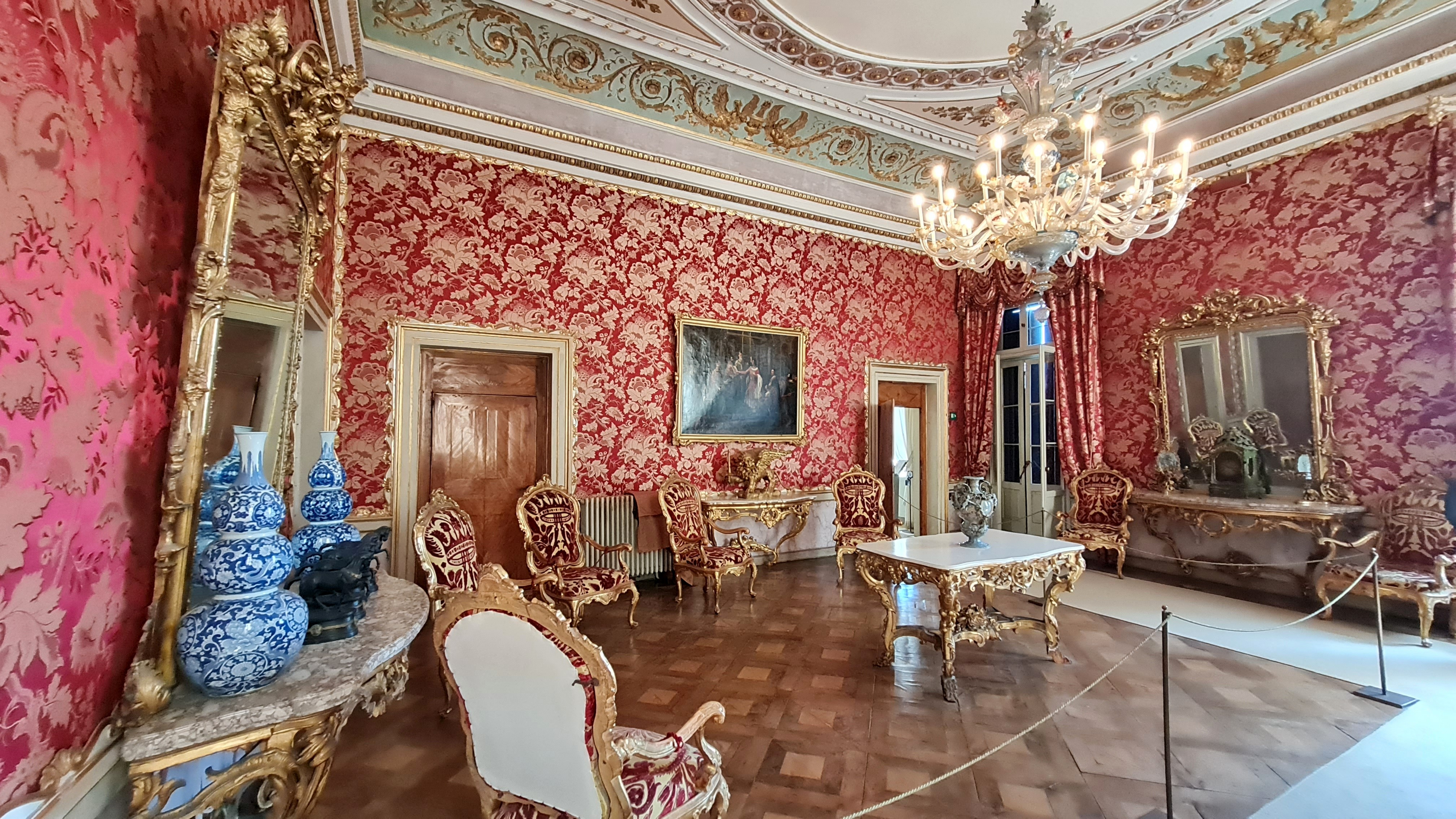
The audience room of Empress Elisabeth

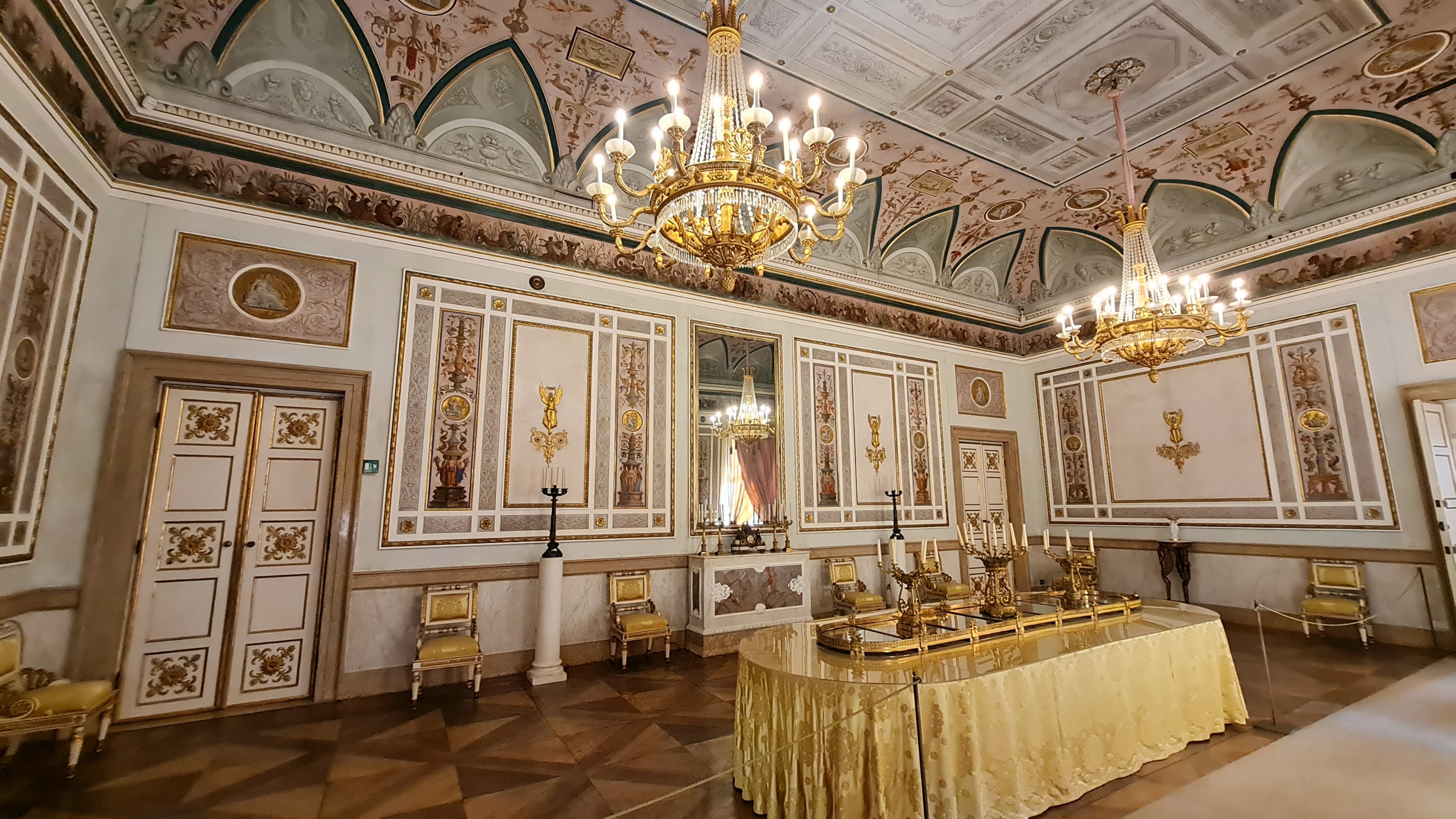
The dining room

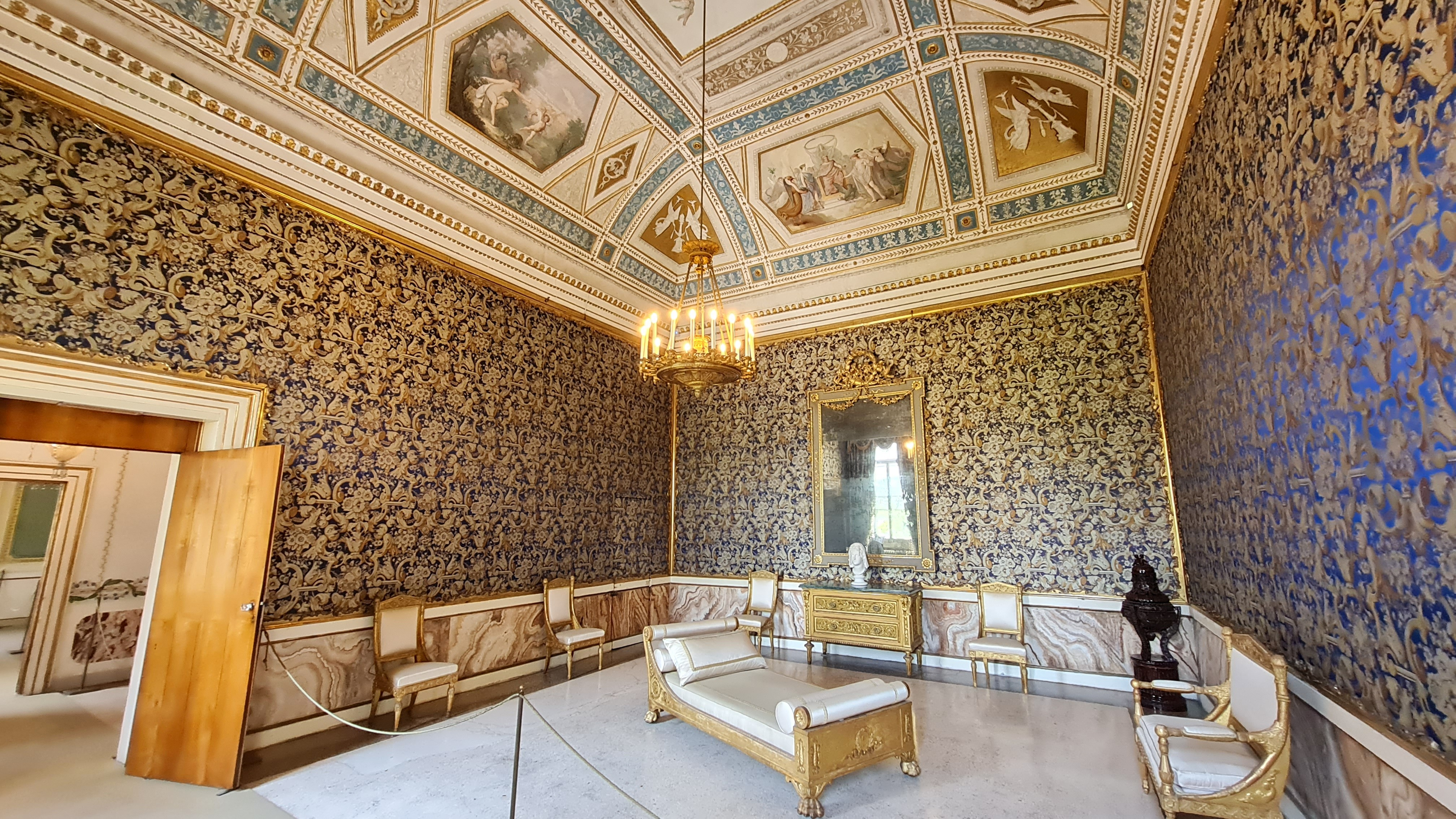
A seating room

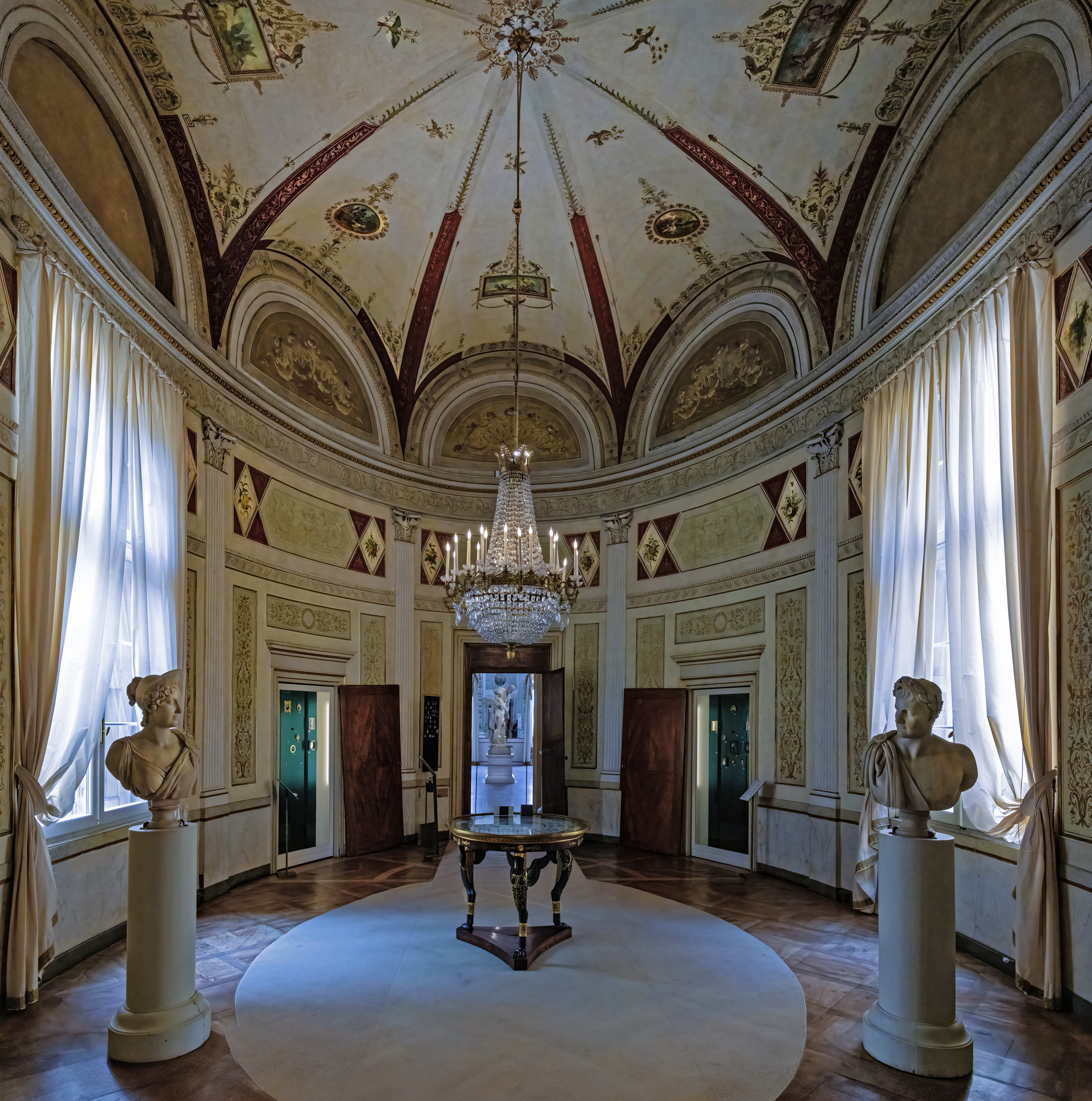
Round room

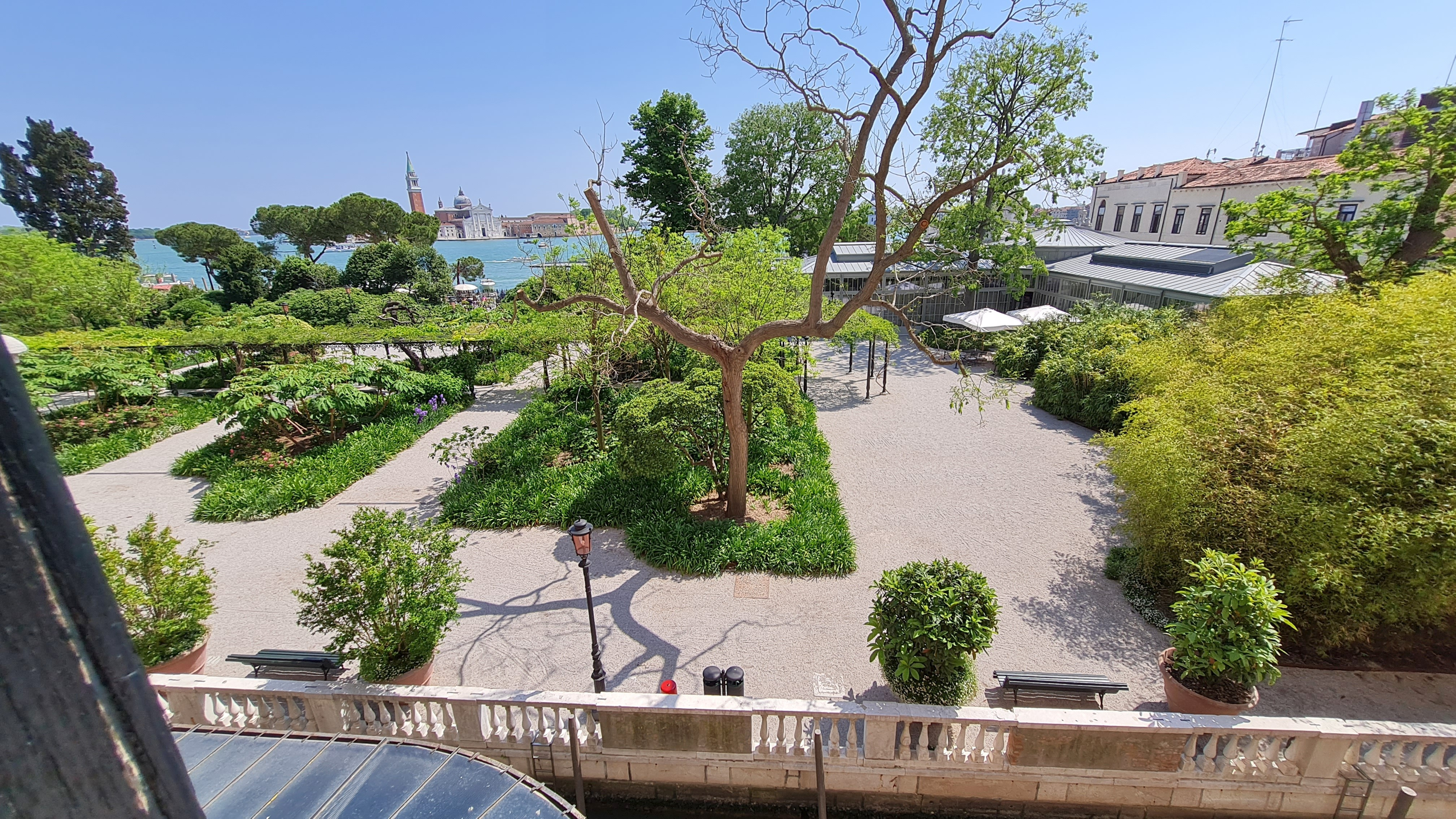
View of the palace gardens

The Royal Palace of Venice (Italian: Palazzo Reale di Venezia) is a complex of buildings located in the central St. Mark's Square of Venice, Italy, which served as the residence for Napoleonic viceroys, the kings of Lombardy-Venetia, Austrian viceroys, and finally, the monarchs of unified Italy. The use and successive modifications of the Royal Palace began in 1807 and ended in 1919 when King Victor Emmanuel III ceded the building to the Italian State. Currently, the complex is divided between the National Library of Venice, the Archaeological Museum, and the Correr Museum.

== History ==
=== Before the Palace became a Palace (16th to 18th century) ===
The Royal Palace of Venice is housed within the Procuratie Nuove (New Procuracies), which border the southern side of St. Mark's Square, and the Marciana Library in the Piazetta facing the Doge's Palace.

From 1537 to 1588, Jacopo Sansovino and Vincenzo Scamozzi built the Palazzo della Libreria, intended to house the library given to the city by Cardinal Bessarion, as well as the ridotti (offices) of the nine Procurators of Saint Mark, prestigious lifelong positions responsible for the administration of the city's sestieri.

However, Venetian institutions required that the procurators live on the square. Yet, they lacked suitable housing. The Procuratie Vecchie (Old Procuracies), built between 1514 and 1538 on the north side of the square, were not used as residences but were rented out at a good price to support the city's administration. To address this issue, an old pilgrims' hospice on the south side of the square was converted into residences for the procurators, six in total, which were occupied based on seniority in the position. However, procurators often declined to reside in these spaces, citing their poor condition, dampness, and lack of light, preferring to live in their city palaces and rent out the procuracies to third parties.

After various discussions and debates, it was decided in 1583 to build a new building for the procurators. Scamozzi was entrusted with the construction, following the articulation of the façade of the neighbouring library but adding an additional floor. After his dismissal in 1597, Francesco di Bernardin Smeraldi and Mario della Carità continued the works, and in 1640, Baldassare Longhena was appointed as the architect and completed the project around 1660. Originally, Scamozzi had designed three blocks with 11 arcades each, containing two apartments, one on each floor, plus the ground floor designated for shops. However, Smeraldi revised the project, creating narrower blocks with five arcades but apartments occupying all upper floors. In total, eight apartments were constructed.

=== Napoleon's Palace (1807-1814) ===
After the fall of the Republic of Venice in 1797, its institutions were abolished, but not the position of procurators, which still existed. However, the New Procuracies were designated to house the headquarters of the Adriatic Prefecture, and after the creation of the Kingdom of Italy in 1805, they served as the residence for Viceroy Eugène de Beauharnais and his family during their visits to the city.

In January 1807, a decree was issued to transform the procuracies into a new Royal Palace, given the impossibility of adapting the old Doge's Palace. However, when Napoleon visited the city later that same year, he had to stay precisely in the Doge's Palace, as the construction had not been completed.

The idea of the royal palace gradually took shape, with two main focal points: to the east, in the former Marciana Library, the reception rooms of the viceroy and his quarters in the former procurators' ridotti (offices); to the west, the new imperial quarters with a grand reception hall and a monumental staircase to be built anew. To construct these last two elements, the architect Giovanni Antonio Antolini proposed demolishing the Church of San Geminiano and building an entrance portico with the staircase. The works began in 1807, but in 1810, due to the slow progress, Antolini was replaced by Giuseppe Maria Soli, who presented a radically different project. Soli proposed also demolishing the angled parts of the procuracies, leaving enough space to build an entire wing. Despite the scale of the project, its architecture was much more conservative, following the design of the New Procuracies, although an attic with a frieze representing Napoleon on the throne and fourteen statues of Roman emperors was added.

The works on the so-called "Napoleonic Wing" were completed at the end of 1813, just a few months before Napoleon abdicated.

The internal decoration of the spaces, following the exuberance of the Empire style close to Percier and Fontaine, was entrusted to Giuseppe Borsato, assisted by Giovanni Carlo Bevilacqua and Giambattista Canal. These tasks extended from 1810 to 1811 and focused not only on the reception rooms facing the square but also on the private rooms facing the lagoon and the gardens. The former ridotti in the Marciana Library, converted into quarters for Eugène de Beauharnais, were also decorated during this period (1807–1808).

=== The Palace of the Emperor of Austria (1814-1866) ===
With the fall of Napoleon, the Royal Palace was converted into the residence in the city of the Lombard-Venetian king, that is, the Emperor of Austria, Francis I was able to visit it as early as 1815. Decoration work continued under Austrian rule in 1814-1817 and 1824–1829, making it the largest neoclassical undertaking in Venice for decades.

From 1834 to 1838, the last major decoration campaign of the palace took place in anticipation of the visit of the new sovereign, Ferdinand I, after his coronation in Milan. Extensive transformations took place inside the "Napoleonic Wing" with the decoration of the staircase, the antechamber, and the creation of the grand ballroom. The palace was inaugurated with Ferdinand I's visit in October 1838.

Two decades later, another sovereign would stay at the Royal Palace, Emperor Francis Joseph I and his wife Elizabeth, "Sissi". Amidst some animosity from the Venetians following the repression of the 1848 revolts, the imperial couple was in the city from November 25, 1856, to January 3, 1857. The Empress visited again between 1861 and 1862, staying seven months in the city, in semi-seclusion due to her health issues. She would visit Venice for the last time incognito in 1895.

=== The Palace of the King of Italy (1866-1919) ===
In 1866, following the Third Italian War of Independence, Venice was incorporated into the Kingdom of Italy. On 7 November, the new king, Victor Emmanuel II, triumphantly entered the city, and the Royal Palace was subsequently used as the royal residence of the House of Savoy. Victor Emmanuel II returned in 1875 to meet with Emperor Franz Joseph in what was once his city. King Umberto I frequently visited the city, coming in 1878, 1879, and 1891 during the launch of the battleship Sicilia. His wife visited alone in 1882 for the launch of the corvette Amerigo Vespucci. Victor Emmanuel III also visited the city at least in 1903, 1907, 1908, and 1912, meeting with Kaiser Wilhelm II during the last two visits.

In 1919, following World War I, the Crown transferred the palace to the State, which decided to dedicate part of its spaces to museum activities.

=== A Palace forgotten (1919–2012) ===
Following the transfer of the Royal Palace of Venice to the Italian State, the building was allocated to:

- Correr Museum (1922), rooms facing the St. Mark's Square.
- Archaeological Museum of Venice (1926), rooms facing the Campanile.
- Marciana National Library (1929), in the former Palazzo della Libreria facing the Piazetta.
- Risorgimento Museum (1936), on the second floor.

Unfortunately, a part of the historical interiors of the palace disappeared in the 1920s when, due to the installation of museums in the rooms facing St. Mark's Square, it was decided to remove the nineteenth-century decoration and expose the original ceiling beams and the bareness of the walls.

Further destruction took place in the 1950s, with the removal of the so-called "General Council Chamber" and "Great Hall," both facing the St Mark's Campanile. Fortunately, the private rooms facing the lagoon were converted into offices, which, although it deteriorated them, also prevented their transformation into neutral museum spaces.

=== Restoration (2012 till Today) ===
In the year 2000, the Italian State transferred the former private rooms of the palace facing the lagoon to the municipality, which had been used as offices since the 1920s. A restoration sponsored by the French Committee for the Preservation of Venice was then initiated. The nine rooms restored by various sponsors were opened to the public in July 2012 under the name "Empress Elizabeth's Rooms." In 2017, the restoration of three ‘ridotti’ of the Marciana Library was also completed. Originally intended for Viceroy Eugène de Beauharnais, they were redecorated in neoclassical style between 1807 and 1811.

In 2021, the second phase of the restoration of the private rooms facing the lagoon was completed, with the opening of fourteen new rooms (in addition to the nine "Sisi" rooms).

== Literature ==
- Howard, Deborah (1980). The Architectural History of Venice. London: B.T. Batsford.
- Morresi, Manuela (1999). Piazza san Marco: istituzioni, poteri e architettura a Venezia nel primo Cinquecento (in Italian). Milan: Electa.
- De Feo, Roberto (2016). Giuseppe Borsato, 1770-1849 (in Italian). Venice: Scripta Edizioni.
- Zieseniss, Jérôme-François (2022). Le Palais royal de Venise: Le joyau caché de la place Saint-Marc (in French). Paris: Flammarion. ISBN 978-2080284327.
