= Yoko Nagae Ceschina =

Japanese-born patron of the arts (1932–2015)

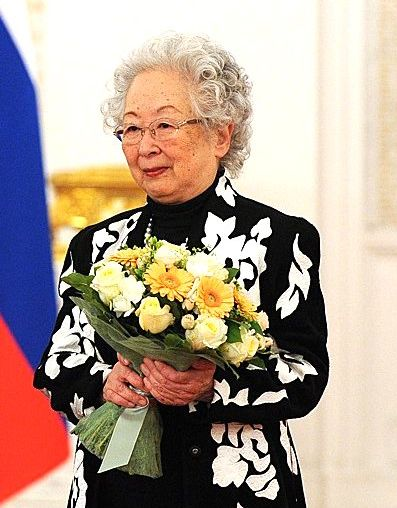
- Yoko Nagae Ceschina in 2014
- Born: April 5, 1932; Kumamoto Prefecture, Japan
- Died: January 10, 2015 (aged 82); Rome, Italy
- Education: Tokyo National University of Fine Arts and Music
- Occupation: Philanthropist
- Honours: Order of Friendship (Russian Federation)

Yoko Nagae Ceschina (チェスキーナ・永江洋子) (5 April 1932 – 10 January 2015) was a Japanese-born patron of the arts and noted patroness of classical music.

== Biography ==
Born in Kumamoto Prefecture, Japan, to a businessman father and mother who played the piano domestically, Yoko Nagae was exposed to music at an early age. Her parents separated when she was 8, and her father discarded the piano from the family residence. To continue playing the piano, she searched out neighbours' residences which had pianos.

After graduating from secondary school, Nagae worked as a substitute music teacher. She later studied harp at the Tokyo National University of Fine Arts and Music. She was briefly married to a university classmate, but this marriage ended in divorce. Following her graduation, she went to Florence, Italy in 1960 to continue her studies in harp. She placed 6th at the 1965 International Harp Contest.

In 1962, at a Venice café, Nagae met Count Renzo Ceschina, a millionaire businessman from Milan approximately 25 years older than her. They began a long courtship, which culminated in their 1977 marriage, when Renzo Ceschina was about age 70. He changed his will after their marriage, bequeathing his entire fortune to his wife. Their marriage lasted until his death in 1982. Ceschina ceased playing the harp after her husband's death. A nephew of Renzo Ceschina challenged the will in court, alleging that Yoko Ceschina had forged her husband's signature. After 10 years, the case was settled in favour of Yoko Ceschina, with confirmation that Renzo Ceschina's signature was genuine. Yoko Ceschina claimed her inheritance, which was valued at the time at approximately USD$190 million.

Yoko Ceschina subsequently sponsored such ensembles and musicians as the New York Philharmonic, Valery Gergiev and the Mariinsky Theatre, Carnegie Hall, the Israel Philharmonic Orchestra, the International Harp Contest, and the National Youth Orchestra of the United States of America. On an individual level, she particularly supported Maxim Vengerov, such as in her contribution of half of the cost of Vengerov's 1727 Stradivarius violin. Because Ceschina avoided the public eye, the complete scope of her philanthropy is not known.

Ceschina was a major sponsor of the visit by the New York Philharmonic to North Korea in 2008. In general, she rarely gave interviews, but regarding the controversies surrounding this concert, she publicly stated to various media organisations:

"I hope that this will lead to some good will. Even if I'm criticized, I believe in my position."

"Music has no borderlines. It is good if people gain some happiness by listening to good music."

"Non capisco assolutamente nulla di politica, ma so che la musica riavvicina le persone e parla un linguaggio universale. Spero di contribuire alla pace." ("I do not understand anything about politics, but I know that music reconciles people and speaks a universal language. I hope to contribute to peace.")

In 2011, Ceschina endowed the music directorship of the New York Philharmonic, the first titled music director chair in the orchestra's history. In November 2014, she received the Russian Federation's Order of Friendship honour.

Ceschina died 2015 in Rome at the age of 82. She was not survived by any children and bequeathed a significant part of her inheritance, including Palazzo Barbarigo and famous Caffè Quadri in Venice, to Russian conductor Valery Gergiev.
