= Caffè Lavena =

Coordinates: 45.43457°N 12.33848°E

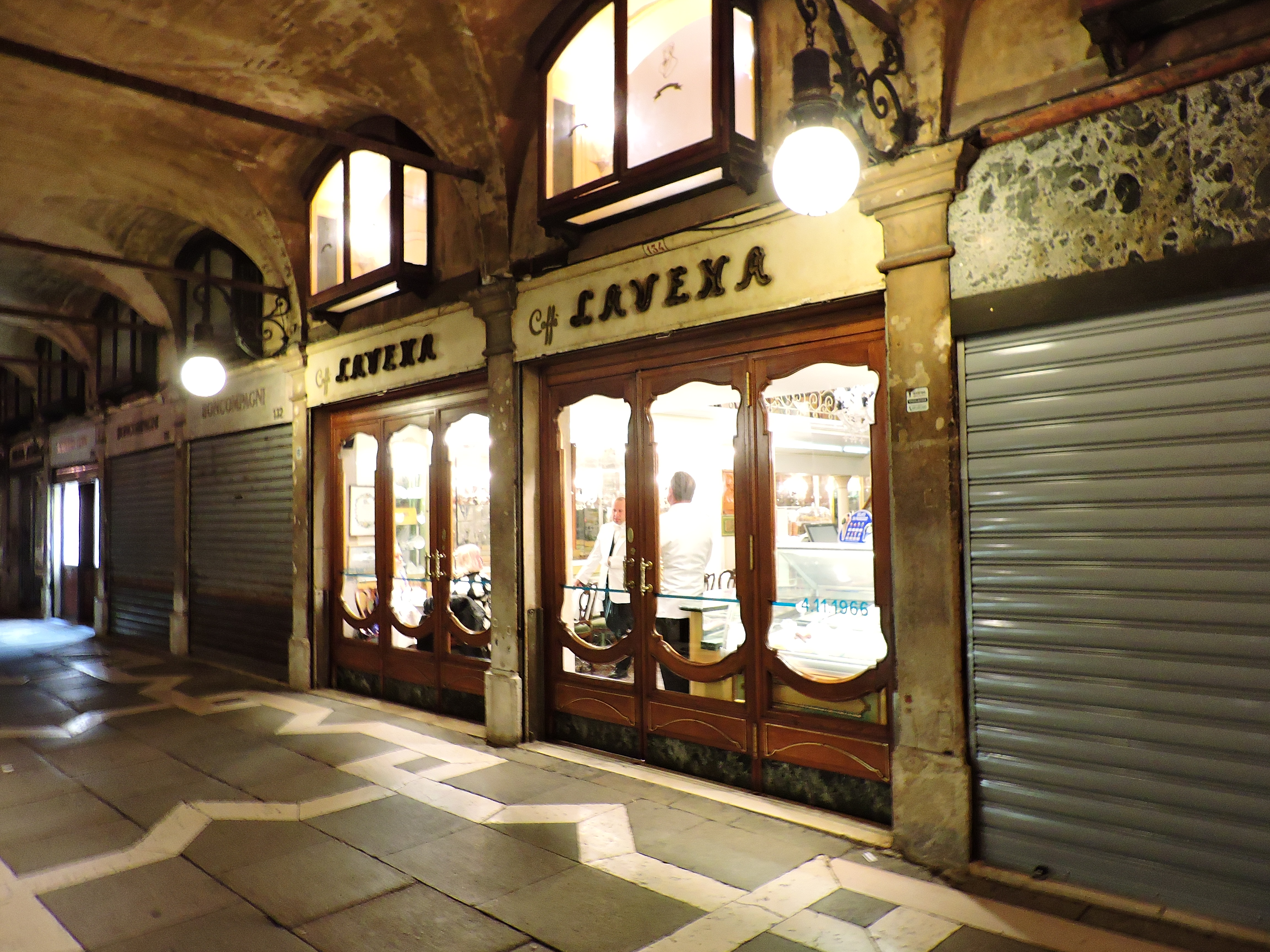
- Interactive map of Caffè Lavena

Restaurant information
- Established: 1750
- Location: P.za San Marco, 133/134, Venice, Italy
- Website: www.caffelavena.it/en/

Caffé Lavena is a café in the city of Venice, Italy.

== History ==
It was established in 1750, and was originally called Regina d'Ungheria (the Queen of Hungary) under the Austro-Hungarian empire. The café has its origins in the popular Venice of the 17th century; it became Orso Coronato (Crowned Bear) because of the picturesque sign showing a bear standing on his hind legs with a crown on its head. In 1860, Carlo Lavena bought the café, and it has remained in his family ever since.
