= St. Mark's Church =

St. Mark's Church, or variations such as St. Mark Church or with Saint spelled out, may mean:

== Australia ==
- St Mark's Anglican Church, Camberwell, a heritage-listed church in Victoria
- St Mark's Anglican Church, Fitzroy, Victoria
- St Mark's Anglican Church, Rockhampton, Queensland
- St Mark's Anglican Church, Warwick, Queensland
- St Marks Anglican Church, Yungaburra, Queensland
- St Mark's Church, Darling Point, a heritage-listed church in New South Wales
- Old St Mark's Anglican Church, Slacks Creek, a heritage-listed church in Queensland

== Canada ==
- St. Mark's Church (Niagara-on-the-Lake), an Anglican church in Niagara-on-the-Lake, Ontario
- St. Mark's Anglican Church (Port Hope, Ontario)

== Croatia ==
- St. Mark's Church, Zagreb

== Denmark ==
- St. Mark's Church, Aarhus
- St. Mark's Church, Copenhagen

== France ==
- St. Mark's Church, Versailles

== India ==
- St. Mark's Church, Chennai

== Ireland ==
- St. Mark's Church, Dublin

== Italy ==
- St Mark's English Church, Florence

== Malta ==
- St Mark's Church, Rabat

== Norway ==
- St. Mark's Church, Bergen
- St. Mark's Church, Oslo

== Serbia ==
- St. Mark's Church, Belgrade
- St. Mark's Church, Užice

== Slovenia ==
- St. Mark's Church, Vrba

== Sri Lanka ==
- St. Mark's Church, Badulla

== Ukraine ==
- St. Mark's Church, Variazh

== United Kingdom ==
=== England ===
==== London ====
- St Mark's Church, Kennington
- St Mark's Church, Myddelton Square, Clerkenwell
- St Mark's Regents Park
- St Mark's Church, Silvertown (Victoria Docks), now deconsecrated
- St Mark's Church, Surbiton
- St Mark's Church, Hamilton Terrace, St John's Wood

==== Elsewhere in England ====
- St Mark's Church, Ampfield, Hampshire
- St Mark's Church, Antrobus, Cheshire
- St Mark's Church, Basford, Staffordshire
- St Mark's Church, Blackburn, Lancashire
- St Mark's Church, Brighton, East Sussex
- St Mark's Church, Bristol, a Grade I listed building
- St Mark's Church, Bournemouth, a Grade II listed building
- Church of St Mark, Broomhill, Sheffield
- St Mark's Church, Dolphinholme, Lancashire
- St Mark's Church, Gillingham, Kent, designed by James Piers St Aubyn
- St Mark's Church, Hadlow Down, East Sussex
- St Mark's Church, Horsham, West Sussex
- St Mark's Church, Leamington Spa, Warwickshire
- St Mark's Church, Mansfield, Nottinghamshire
- St Mark's Church, Natland, Cumbria
- St Mark's Church, Nether Kellet, Lancashire
- St Mark's Church, Preston, Lancashire
- St Mark's Church, Royal Tunbridge Wells, Kent
- St Mark's Church, Saltney, Cheshire
- St Mark's Church, Scarisbrick, Lancashire
- St Mark's Church, Shelton, Staffordshire
- St Mark's Church, Swindon, Wiltshire
- St. Mark's Church, Woolston, Southampton
- St Mark's Church, Wootton, Isle of Wight

=== Isle of Man ===
- St Mark's Church, St Mark's, Malew, Isle of Man, one of Isle of Man's Registered Buildings

=== Northern Ireland ===
- St Mark's Church, Dundela, Belfast

=== Wales ===
- St Mark's Church, Brithdir, Gwynedd, a grade I listed building
- St Mark's Church, Connah's Quay, Flintshire
- St Mark's Church, Newport

== United States ==
=== Colorado ===
- St. Mark's Church (Denver, Colorado), a Denver Landmark

=== Connecticut ===
- St. Mark Church (Stratford, Connecticut)

=== Delaware ===
- St. Mark's Church, Millsboro, Sussex County, Delaware

=== Georgia ===
- St. Mark's Anglican Church (Moultrie, Georgia)

=== New Jersey ===
- St. Mark Coptic Orthodox Church (Jersey City, New Jersey), also known as Saint Mark Church

=== New York ===
- St. Mark's Church (Clark Mills, New York), NRHP-listed
- German Evangelical Lutheran Church of St. Mark, New York City
- St. Mark the Evangelist Church (New York City)
- St. Mark's Church in-the-Bowery, New York City
- St. Mark's Church (Port Leyden, New York), NRHP-listed

=== Ohio ===
- Saint Mark's Lutheran School and Church (Milford, Ohio), LCMS establishment

=== South Carolina ===
- St. Mark's Episcopal Church (Pinewood, South Carolina), NRHP-listed

=== Washington D.C. ===
- St. Mark's Episcopal Church (Washington, D.C.), NRHP-listed

== See also ==
- St. Mark's (disambiguation)
- Saint Mark's Cathedral (disambiguation)
- Saint Mark's Coptic Orthodox Church (disambiguation)
- St. Mark's Episcopal Church (disambiguation)
- St. Mark's Episcopal Cathedral (disambiguation)
- St. Mark's Lutheran Church (disambiguation)
- St Mark's Basilica
- Crkva Svetog Marka (disambiguation)
