= St. Mark's Episcopal Church =

St. Mark's Episcopal Church and variations may refer to:

- St. Mark's Episcopal Church (Hope, Arkansas)
- St. Mark's Episcopal Church (Glendale, California)
- St. Mark's Episcopal Church (Berkeley, California)
- St. Mark's Episcopal Church (Washington, D.C.)
- St. Mark's Episcopal Church (Cocoa, Florida)
- St. Mark's Episcopal Church (Haines City, Florida)
- St. Mark's Episcopal Church (Palatka, Florida)
- St. Mark's Episcopal Church (Starke, Florida)
- St. Mark's Episcopal Church (Louisville, Kentucky)
- St. Mark's Episcopal Church (Shreveport, Louisiana)
- St. Mark's Episcopal Church (Augusta, Maine)
- St. Mark's Episcopal Church (Highland, Maryland)
- St. Mark's Episcopal Church (Kingston, Maryland)
- St. Mark's Episcopal Church (Lappans, Maryland)
- St. Mark's Episcopal Church (Perryville, Maryland)
- St. Mark's Episcopal Church (Boston, Massachusetts)
- St. Mark's Episcopal Church (Worcester, Massachusetts)
- St. Mark's Episcopal Cathedral (Minneapolis), Minnesota
- St. Mark's Episcopal Chapel (Corinna Township, Minnesota)
- Saint Mark's Episcopal Church (Raymond, Mississippi)
- St. Mark's Pro-Cathedral (Hastings, Nebraska)
- St. Mark's Episcopal Church (Tonopah, Nevada)
- St. Mark's Episcopal Church (Ashland, New Hampshire)
- St. Mark's Episcopal Church (West Orange, New Jersey)
- Saint Mark's Episcopal Church (Chelsea, New York)
- St. Mark's Episcopal Church (Fort Montgomery, New York)
- St. Mark's Episcopal Church (Green Island, New York)
- St. Mark's Episcopal Church (Hoosick Falls, New York)
- St. Mark's Episcopal Church (Mt. Kisco, New York)
- Saint Mark's and Saint John's Episcopal Church, Rochester, New York
- St. Mark's Episcopal Church (Halifax, North Carolina)
- St. Mark's Episcopal Church (Huntersville, North Carolina)
- St. Mark's Episcopal Church (Wadsworth, Ohio)
- St. Mark's Episcopal Church (Jim Thorpe, Pennsylvania)
- St. Mark's Episcopal Church (Philadelphia)
- St. Mark's Episcopal Church (Pinewood, South Carolina)
- St. Mark's Episcopal Church (San Antonio, Texas)
- St. Mark's Cathedral (Salt Lake City)
- St. Mark's Episcopal Church (Alexandria, Virginia)
- St. Mark's Episcopal Cathedral, Seattle
- St. Mark's Episcopal Church (St. Albans, West Virginia)
- St. Mark's Episcopal Church (Beaver Dam, Wisconsin)
- St. Mark's Episcopal Church, Guild Hall and Vicarage, Oconto, Wisconsin
- St. Mark's Episcopal Church (Cheyenne, Wyoming)

== See also ==
- St. Mark's Episcopal Cathedral (disambiguation)
- St. Mark's Church (disambiguation)
