= Saint Mark's Coptic Orthodox Cathedral (disambiguation) =

Saint Mark's Coptic Orthodox Cathedral in Cairo is the seat of the Coptic Orthodox Pope.

Saint Mark's Coptic Orthodox Cathedral may also refer to:

- Saint Mark's Coptic Orthodox Cathedral (Alexandria), traditional seat of the Coptic Orthodox Pope
- Saint Mark's Coptic Orthodox Cathedral (Azbakeya), in Cairo, seat of the Coptic Pope from 1800 to 1971

== See also ==
- Saint Mark's Coptic Orthodox Church (disambiguation)
