= Richard Meredyth Richards =

Richard Meredyth Richards (18 January 1821 – 4 November 1873) was a Welsh barrister. He was a justice of the peace, and high sheriff for the county of Merionethshire.

Escutcheon of Richards of Caerynwch

== Life ==
He was the son of Richard Richards (1787–1860), and matriculated at Merton College, Oxford in 1838, graduating B.A. in 1842 and M.A. in 1845. He was called to the bar at the Inner Temple in 1846.

He married Louisa Janette Anne Edwards (died 1899), daughter of Edward Lloyd Edward whose family owned Cerrig Llwydion Hall in Denbighshire. After his death she married the Rev Charles Tooth founder of St Mark's English Church, Florence in 1894 and commissioned the Arts and Crafts St Mark's Church, Brithdir in Tooth's memory.
