= Jimmy McClain (radio personality) =

American radio personality who became a priest (born 1912)

Jimmy McClain (born James Wesley McClain; July 12, 1912) was an American radio personality who became an Episcopal priest.

== Early years ==
Soon after James Wesley McClain was born on July 12, 1912, in Louisville, Kentucky, he and his family moved to Dallas, Texas. His father was president of the Louisville Conservatory of Music, and his mother was a church organist. When he was "quite young", he and his family lived in Birmingham, Alabama. He studied piano and voice when he was young. He graduated from Southern Methodist University (SMU) with majors in English and public speaking. While there he was a member of the dramatic club and the varsity debating team.

== Early radio career ==
Following his graduation from SMU, McClain joined the Dallas Little Theater and became an announcer at radio station WFAA in Dallas. In July 1937 he began hosting Backstage on Tuesday evenings on WOAI in San Antonio, Texas. He also was the announcer for Can You Solve It?, a mystery drama that began on WOAI in October 1937. By March 1938 he had become studio manager at KABC in San Antonio. He worked for a year as program director there before he moved to a statewide network.

By November 1939 he was an actor, assistant production manager, news commentator and writer for the Texas State Network (TSN), "the world's fourth largest network". His programs with TSN included Five Wise Guys, Jimmy McClain, the Dollar Man, The Perfect Host Entertains, and The Married life of Gary and Jill (which he also wrote). In addition to performing on TSN programs, he wrote the network's Between the Lines in Mother Goose.

McClain worked for the Grant Advertising Agency, heading part of its radio division. One of the projects under his supervision was Dr. I.Q., a quiz show that the agency had created. When the program's quizmaster, Lew Valentine, left to go into military service, McClain replaced him. He soon became known by his quiz persona as well as by his own name. Before he had been in that role three years he was being paid $2,000 per week.

=== Dr. I. Q. ===
Valentine had created an "excited, quick-moving style" for the program, which meant that McClain had to change his on-air speech patterns from his slower Texas way of talking. He listened to recordings of Valentine's work on the show, raised the pitch of his voice, and began "popping questions in fire-engine tempo" to satisfy the sponsor's expectations. McClain's first appearance as Dr. I. Q. occurred on March 31, 1941, when the program was originating from Seattle, Washington. He traveled to various American cities in his role as Dr. I. Q. The show was put on in local theaters, with stays of seven weeks or more in some cases. By mid-September 1942 he had traveled almost 22,000 miles and conducted shows in 30 cities. The longest stay was 19 weeks in Chicago.

On May 11, 1941, Dr. I. Q. Jr. debuted on NBC with McClain as quizmaster. Children ages 6 to 16 participated to win prizes of cash and merchandise. Different sets of questions were used for different age groups.

==== Support of war effort ====
During World War II McLain headed two types of activities to raise funds in support of the United States' activities. He adapted the Dr. I. Q. format with a patriotic element. When he appeared at public functions such as meetings of civic clubs and church groups, he asked for volunteers to be contestants with the understanding that "if they answer his questions correctly they will be privileged to buy a specified number of defense stamps". By March 1943 his efforts had been instrumental in producing more than $2 million in sales of war bonds. Additionally he staged in-person only sessions with the format of the radio program. Admission to the special programs was via purchase of a war bond, with better seats in the theater going to people who bought higher-value bonds.

== Ministry ==
A fallng-down parish house in York, Pennsylvania, led McClain to reconsider his career. He was living in Leaders Heights, Pennsylvania, and active in St. John's Episcopal Church. When he saw the building in 1943, he felt that the Dr. I.Q. program could help. Charging admission of $1 brought in $1,700, and McClain's focus began shifting from radio to religion. He enrolled at Seabury-Western Theological Seminary in Evanston, Illinois, and studied for the ministry while continuing his work on the quiz show, as the sponsors allowed him to commute from the seminary's campus by plane to the site of the program each week. He was both quizmaster and student until the original host returned in 1946. He graduated in June 1947, prepared to move to a parish in Eastland, Texas. A convert to the Episcopal Church, he preferred country and small-town ministry and said, "I have no ambition to be elevated to a higher station in the church. I'm as high now as I'll ever be, and I'm satisfied." McClain was ordained a deacon in 1946 at St. Mark's Episcopal Church in Louisville. That ordination qualified him to perform clerical duties other than celebrating mass. He received his diploma on June 12, 1947, and he took charge of a mission in Eastland, effective July 1, 1947.

McClain explained his change of careers as his response to God's will for him, adding that many people were unhappy because they either resisted a calling from God or never felt what that vocation was. Although he brought happiness to many people via his radio career, he said, "It's not what you can do for others, but what you can do for God."

In 1949 McClain returned to broadcasting as a sideline to raise money for his church. Three days a week he was featured on the Mrs. Tucker Smile Program, which was distributed from Dallas to southwestern radio stations. All of the money that he earned in that role went to Holy Trinity Church in Eastland to reduce the debt from a newly constructed church. By April 1950 he had moved to St. Mark's Episcopal Church in Irving, Texas, and was making personal appearances to raise money for the church's Home and School for Children construction project. The fundraising events were patterned after the Dr. I. Q. program. In 1951 he made Think It Over station break announcements for KIXL in Dallas with his earnings again donated to the church's building fund.

Late in 1952 McClain was the subject of an episode of the television program This Is Your Life. During the broadcast, host Ralph Edwards said that McClain had an unrealized dream of creating a dairy ranch for boys who came from broken homes. Donations came in, and for two years McClain managed and promoted the development of such a ranch near Longview, Texas. The ranch was in operation for about three years. In 1954 McClain left the ministry to return to broadcasting.

== Later broadcasting career ==
On January 30, 1954, McClain returned to the role of Dr. I. Q., this time on television. A contemporary newspaper report said, "Rev. McClain ... has returned to broadcasting temporarily to raise money for a pet project, a ranch for boys in Texas." Columnist Larry Wolters wrote in a review of the program in the Chicago Tribune, "We do not know whether McClain is still serving as a rector. But to this observer it's distasteful to see the Rev. Mr. McClain surrounded by cardboard silver dollars serving as a barker for a lipstick concern." He added at the end of the review, "... it's rather sad that a man, who spent a half dozen years training for the ministry, has seen fit to return to such a useless venture".

McClain went into radio management in 1955. Until 1962, he was general manager of Don Mitchell radio stations in Rome, Georgia, and Smyrna, Georgia. After that he worked at television station WLW-D in Dayton, Ohio. His program, The Jimmy McClain Show, debuted on October 15, 1962.

In May 1979 McClain became marketing director for Videa Ltd. in Cedar Rapids, Iowa.

== Personal life ==
McClain and his wife, the former Elizabeth Phelps, had three daughters and two sons.
