= Saint Mark's Cathedral =

Saint Mark's Cathedral may refer to several cathedrals named for Saint Mark (Mark the Evangelist):

== Australia ==
- St Mark's Cathedral, Port Pirie, South Australia

== Croatia ==
- Korčula Cathedral

== Egypt ==
- Saint Mark's Coptic Orthodox Cathedral (Alexandria)
- Saint Mark's Coptic Orthodox Cathedral, Abbassia, Cairo
- Saint Mark's Coptic Orthodox Cathedral, Azbakeya, Cairo

== India ==
- St. Mark's Cathedral, Bangalore

== Italy ==
- St Mark's Basilica in Venice
- San Marco Evangelista al Campidoglio, Rome
- San Marco, Florence

== Mexico ==
- St. Mark's Cathedral, Tuxtla Gutiérrez

== South Africa ==
- St Mark's Cathedral, George, Western Cape

== Uganda ==
- St Mark's Cathedral, Luweero

== United States ==
- St. Mark's Cathedral (Shreveport, Louisiana) (Episcopal)
- St. Mark's Episcopal Cathedral (Minneapolis), Minnesota
- St. Mark's Pro-Cathedral (Hastings, Nebraska) (Episcopal)
- St. Mark's Cathedral (Salt Lake City), Utah (Episcopal)
- St. Mark's Episcopal Cathedral, Seattle, Washington

== See also ==
- St. Mark's Church (disambiguation)
- St. Mark's (disambiguation)
- Saint Mark's Coptic Orthodox Church (disambiguation)
- St. Mark's Episcopal Church (disambiguation)
- St. Mark's Episcopal Cathedral (disambiguation)
