= St. Mark's Episcopal Cathedral =

St. Mark's Episcopal Cathedral may refer to:

- St. Mark's Episcopal Cathedral (Minneapolis), Minnesota
- St. Mark's Cathedral (Salt Lake City), Utah
- St. Mark's Episcopal Cathedral, Seattle, Washington

== See also ==
- St. Mark's Episcopal Church (disambiguation)
- St. Mark's Church (disambiguation)
- St. Mark's (disambiguation)
- Saint Mark's Cathedral (disambiguation)
- Saint Mark's Cathedral (disambiguation)
- Saint Mark's Coptic Orthodox Church (disambiguation)
- St Mark's Basilica
