= Allen C. Anthony =

American actor and announcer on radio and television

Allen C. Anthony (1906 or 1907 - May 10, 1962) was an American actor and announcer on radio and television.

== Early years ==
Anthony was a native of Boyle County, Kentucky. He was educated at Elmwood Academy, LaSalle University, Blackstone School of Law, and the College of Religious Sciences in New York.

== Career ==
Anthony began working on radio in Louisville, Kentucky, in 1932. After a short time at station WAVE, he moved to WHAS, where he worked for approximately three years. In the late 1930s, he was the chief announcer at KWK radio in St. Louis, Missouri.

Anthony was announcer and master of ceremonies on the Dr. I.Q. radio program from 1938 to 1950. Radio historian John Dunning wrote, "Allen C. Anthony, the Mars announcer, was well known for his ability to make the candy as appealing as the money". (Prizes on the program were 10 silver dollars and boxes of Mars and Milky Way candy.) Anthony portrayed Jonathan Blake on The Web. Other programs on which he was host or announcer included The $64,000 Challenge, Appointment with Adventure, Can You Top This?, Father Knows Best, Inner Sanctum, and Stop the Music.

Health problems caused Anthony to leave the pressures of network broadcasting. He went to Atlanta in 1959 to be director of air personnel at WAGA-TV in Atlanta, Georgia. He also was host of the station's Morning Movie program and often presented weather forecasts and made commercials.

== Personal life and death ==
Anthony and his wife, Mary, had a daughter and two sons. He died in Georgia Baptist Hospital in Atlanta on May 10, 1962, aged 55.
