= St. Mark's Lutheran Church =

St. Mark's Lutheran Church may refer to:

- St. Mark's Lutheran Church (Elberta, Alabama), listed on U.S. NRHP
- St. Mark's Lutheran Church (Guilderland, New York), NRHP

== See also ==
- St. Mark's Church (disambiguation)
