= E. E. Burdick House =

Historic house in Nevada, United States

- U.S. National Register of Historic Places
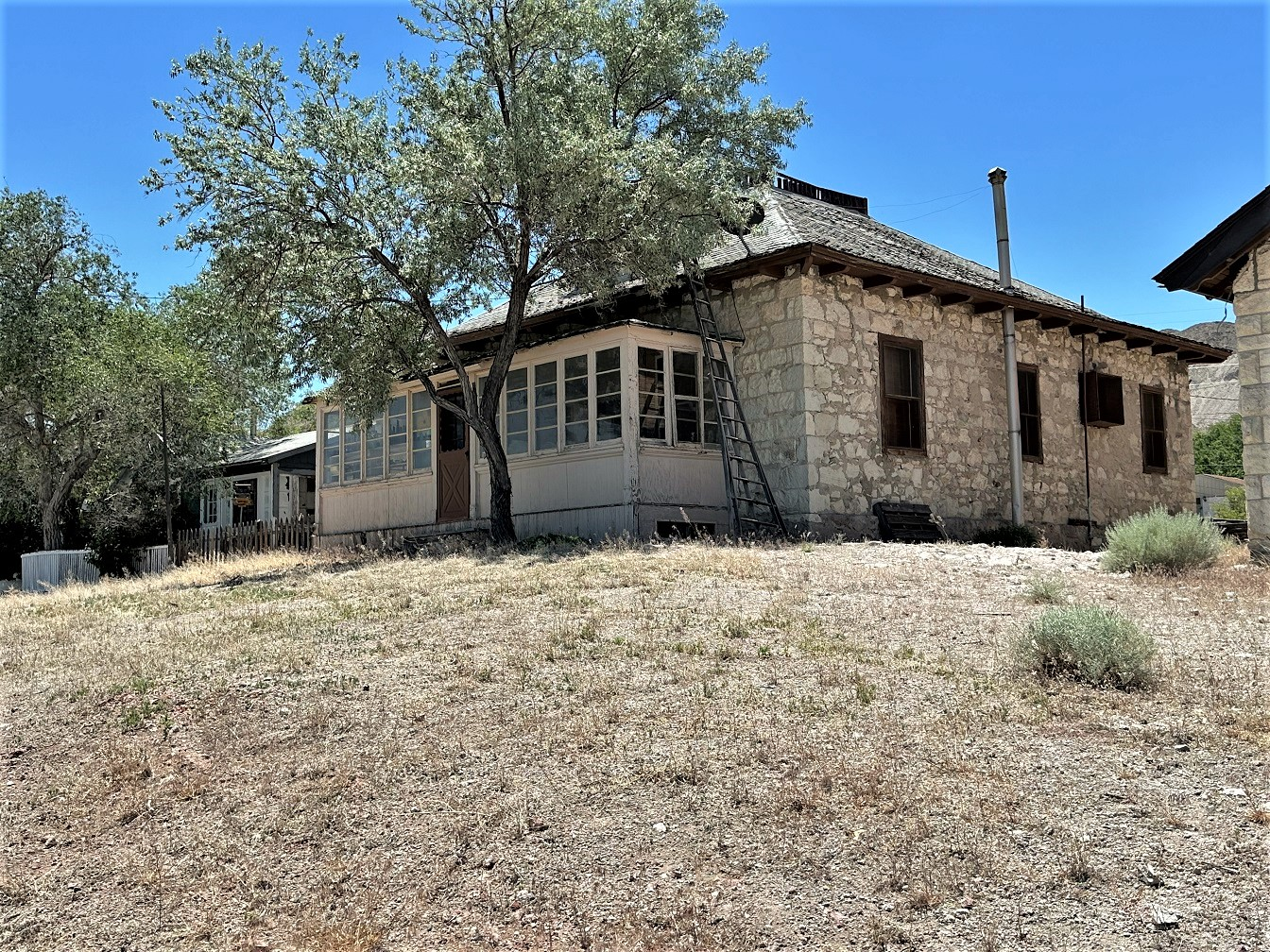
- Burdick House in 2024

- Location within Nevada Location within the United States
- Location: 248 Prospect St. Tonopah, Nevada
- Coordinates: 38.06517°N 117.23128°W
- Area: less than one acre
- Built: 1906
- Built by: Burdick, E.E.
- Architectural style: Neo-Colonial
- MPS: Tonopah MRA
- NRHP reference No.: 82003223
- Added to NRHP: May 20, 1982

The E. E. Burdick House, at 248 Prospect St. in Tonopah, Nevada, United States, was built in 1906. It has also been known as St. Marks P.E. Church Parsonage. It was listed on the National Register of Historic Places in 1982.

It is a 35-by-35-foot (11 m × 11 m) square plan stone house. It was deemed significant for its style and its stone masonry construction, and its association with local stonemason E.E. Burdick who built it and lived there. Stylistic elements include its "attention to symmetry" and its "classically detailed eaves". According to its historic property survey description, its "stone masonry construction along with its stylistic treatments combines to provide one of the finest historic residential structures in Tonopah." The house was eventually purchased by the next-door St. Marks P.E. Church, which was also built by Burdick, for use as a parsonage.
