= Dr. I.Q. =

American radio and TV quiz series

- Also known as: Doctor IQ
- Genre: Game show
- Presented by: James McClain (NBC Radio; January–October 1954); Lew Valentine (ABC Radio); Jay Owen (November 1953–January 1954); Tom Kennedy (1958–1959)
- Narrated by: Bob Shepard (1953–1954); Bill Ewing (1958–1959)
- Country of origin: United States

Production
- Production locations: Various locations throughout the United States (1939–1950); Elysee Theater, New York City (1953–1954); ABC Television Center, Studio D, Los Angeles (1958–1959)

Original release
- Network: NBC (Radio); ABC (Radio; 1953–1954, 1958–1959)
- Release: April 10, 1939 – March 23, 1959

Dr. I.Q. (aka Dr. I.Q., the Mental Banker and Doctor I.Q.) is a radio and television quiz program that ran from 1939 – 1959.

== Background ==
A "trial run" of Dr. I.Q. was staged at the Fox Theatre in Atlanta, Georgia, to test whether the program's format might be viable for radio. Allen C. Anthony, the program's announcer, said in 1961, "Overflow crowds at the Fox convinced producers that the Dr. I.Q. Show would go. When the 'I have a lady in the balcony, doctor' caught on, we knew we had it."

== Radio ==
Over decades, the program's sponsors were Mars Candy, the Vick Chemical Company and Embassy Cigarettes. The radio series did not have a set studio. Instead, it traveled from city to city and broadcast from large concert halls and theaters.

The quizmaster, Dr. I.Q., delivered silver dollars to audience members who correctly answered his fast-paced questions. The series began April 10, 1939, on NBC's Blue Network with singer-announcer Lew Valentine as Dr. I.Q. Later quizmasters in the role of Dr. I.Q. were Jimmy McClain and Stanley Vainrib. The radio version aired until November 29, 1950, on the NBC and ABC networks. Valentine and McClain were also the hosts of Dr. I.Q. Jr., a juvenile version heard on NBC from 1941 to 1949.

== Television ==
The television version ran on ABC from November 4, 1953, to October 17, 1954, and again from December 15, 1958, to March 23, 1959. The first host was Jay Owen. However, beginning January 18, 1954, McClain began hosting again. Tom Kennedy hosted the 1958–59 version. Carol Byron was the hostess.

On January 18, 1954, Hazel Bishop cosmetics became a sponsor of the program.

== Episode status ==
Only one episode is known to exist of the 1953-54 version, and it is with McClain as host. Four episodes exist with Kennedy (including a probable pilot taped on October 15, 1958) along with a pilot for a television version of Dr. I.Q. Jr.

== Sources ==
- I Have a Lady in the Balcony: Memoirs of a Broadcaster in Radio and Television
