= Charles Tooth =

Anglican clergyman and founder of St Mark's English Church, Florence

- Born: 14 February 1831; Cranbrooke, Kent
- Died: 2 August 1894 (aged 63); Gibraltar
- Occupation: Anglican clergyman
- Known for: Founder of St Mark's English Church, Florence

The Reverend Charles Tooth was an Anglican clergyman and founder of St Mark's English Church, Florence.

== Early life ==
Charles Tooth was born 14 February 1831 in Cranbrooke, Kent. He was the son of Robert Tooth (1799–1867) and Mary Ann Reader (c. 1801 – 1845).

Tooth became managing partner of the Tooth Brothers' brewery (later Crescent Brewery) in Burton upon Trent in 1855. This was founded mainly to export beer to the business run by his brothers Robert (1821–1893), Edwin and Frederick in Sydney, Australia where demand for beer had increased as a result of the Australian gold rushes. It closed after financial problems early in the next decade. He was author or coauthor of patents related to brewing.

== Ministry ==
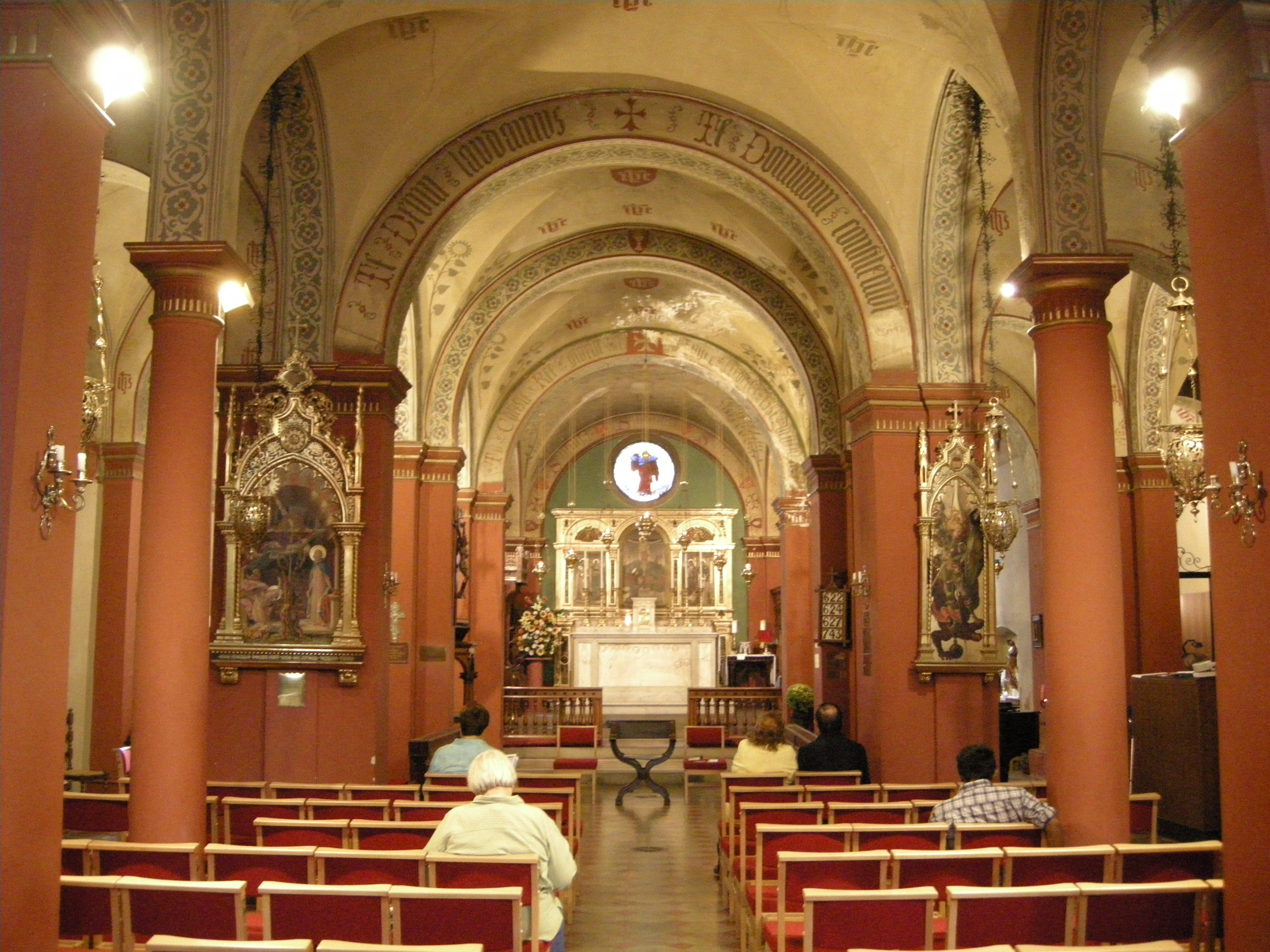
Interior of St Mark's English Church, Florence

Tooth was admitted as a fellow-commoner to Downing College in 1860 and graduated from the University of Cambridge with a B.A. in 1864. He was ordained deacon in 1863 and priest in 1864 (his brothers Arthur and William Augustus also studied at Cambridge and were ordained in the same year).

He served as curate in Uxbridge (then in Middlesex) 1863–65, was perpetual curate of St George's, Falfield, Gloucestershire 1865–71, vicar of Grandborough, Warwickshire 1871–72 and rector of St Mark's, Snow Hill in Shelton, Staffordshire 1872–75.

Tooth moved to Tuscany for health reasons in 1876, where he was the Anglican chaplain in Siena. He founded St Mark's as a centre of worship for Anglo-Catholic members of the Anglican Church in Florence. He started an independent house church at 1 Via dei Serragli in 1877 to teach Anglo-Catholic principles and celebrate the Eucharist daily during the week. In 1880, Tooth purchased a 15th-century palazzo to meet the new congregation's needs. The building was altered by Tooth, who turned the ground floor into a church with nave, aisles, transept and chancel, and seating 400. John Roddam Spencer Stanhope designed and created the wall and ceiling decorations at his own expense. The first Eucharist was celebrated there on 1 May 1881, although chaplain and church were not licensed for service by the bishop until 1884. He remained chaplain of St Mark's until 1894.

== Legacy ==
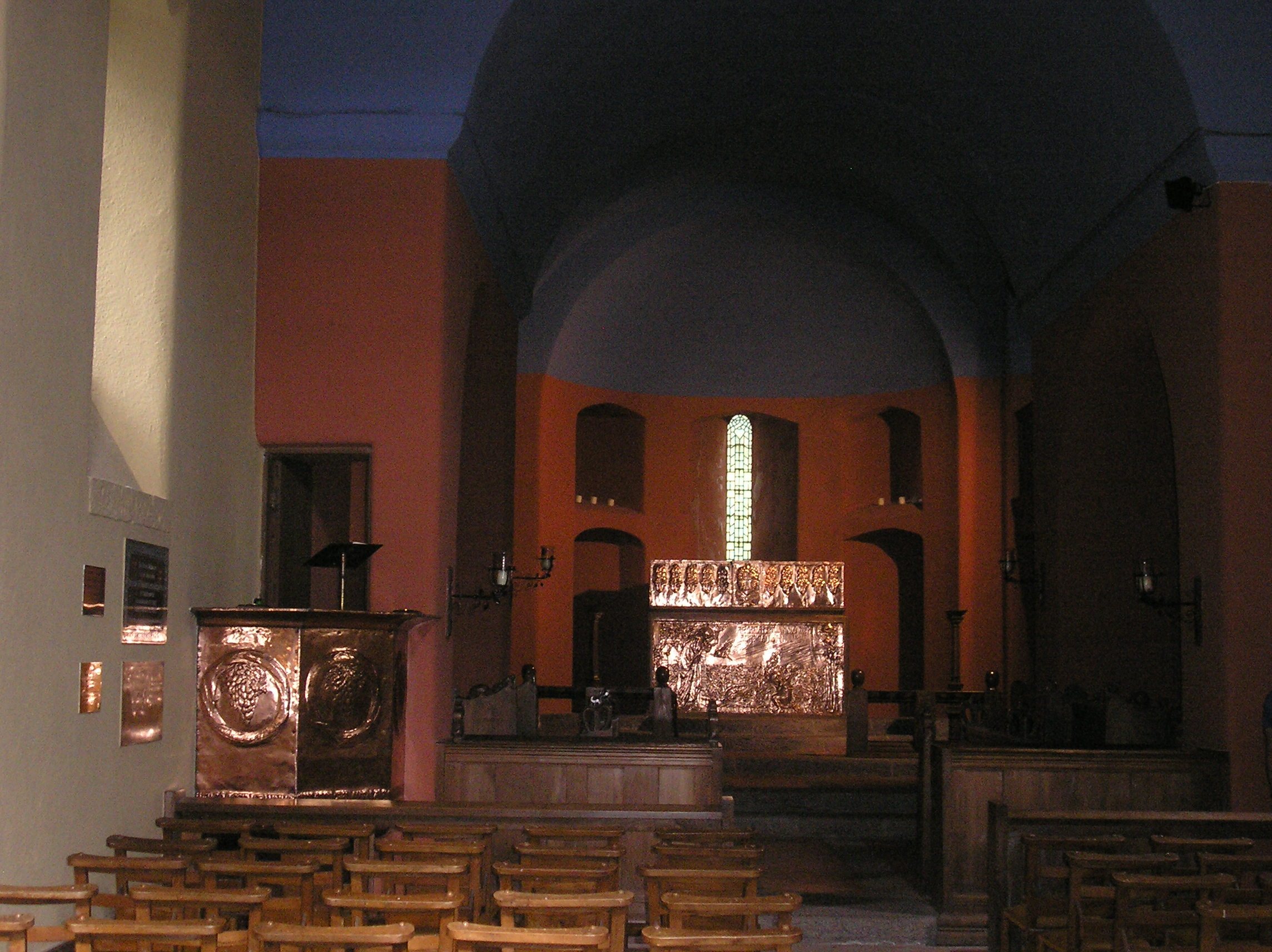
Interior of St Mark's Church, Brithdir, Gwynedd

He married Eliza Tabberer (died 1892) in 1855.

Charles Tooth married Louisa Janette Anne Edwards (died 1899) in 1894. Louisa Tooth was the daughter of Edward Lloyd Edward whose family owned Cerrig Llwydion Hall in Denbighshire. Her first husband was Richard Meredyth Richards, a JP and high sheriff for the county of Merionethshire.

Charles Tooth died the same year, on 2 August 1894 in Gibraltar.

Louisa Tooth, his widow, commissioned the building of St Mark's Church, Brithdir in Gwynedd, North Wales in his memory. It was designed by Henry Wilson in the style of the Arts and Crafts movement. Building started in 1895 and the church was consecrated in 1898. It is designated a Grade I listed building by Cadw who describe it as "an exceptionally important and advanced work for its date". It is cared for by the Friends of Friendless Churches.
