= Pacific Mozart Ensemble =

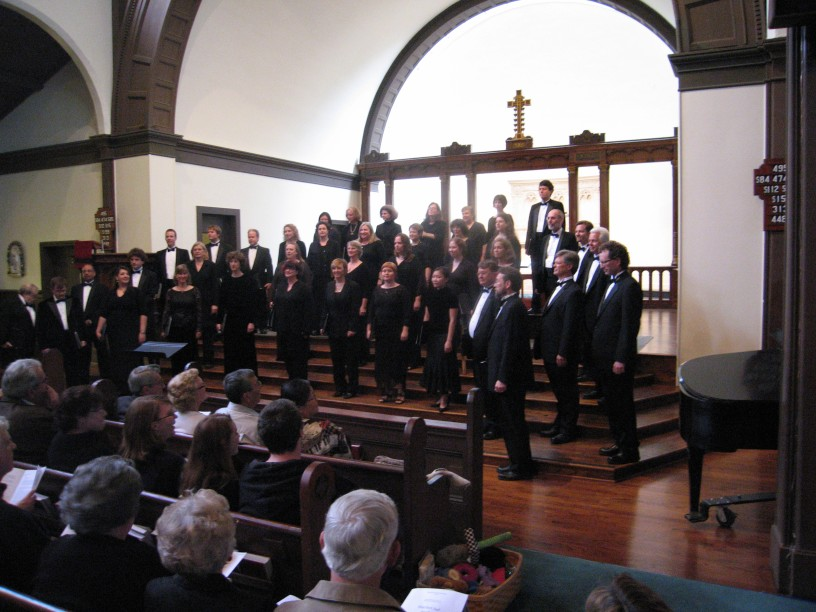
PME Performing at St. Mark's Episcopal Church in Berkeley, CA (2007).

Pacific Edge Voices (formerly The Pacific Mozart Ensemble (PME)) is a volunteer choral organization based in Berkeley, CA. The group was formed to provide a chorus of professional quality for highly skilled and experienced singers who did not wish to make singing a full-time profession. It was to be large enough to perform the major concert literature, but small enough to remain highly selective. PEV presents a wide range of choral musical styles, including, but not limited to, traditional choral literature, new works by contemporary composers and a cappella jazz and pop. PEV performs at least three self-produced concerts sets each year, along with various collaborations, often with prominent artists including Dave Brubeck, Meredith Monk, Kent Nagano & Sufjan Stevens. The first and second concerts of the year (typically Nov and March) are classically oriented programs. Over the years these programs have tended toward 20th-century composers. The chorus has become known around the San Francisco Bay Area for its innovative programming. A particular highlight came in 2002 when the chorus performed Kurt Weill’s Der Lindberghflug alongside works by Philip Glass, Meredith Monk and David Lang. The concert was presented in the East Bay on the aircraft carrier Hornet and in San Francisco in the newly constructed Aviation Museum at SFO. The 3rd concert set each year is an all a cappella ‘pops’ concert featuring the group in various formations from 2 up to 50, performing arrangements of jazz, pop, rock, & folk tunes.

== Origins ==
Pacific Edge Voices was formed, as Pacific Mozart Ensemble, in 1980 by members of Berkeley Chorus Pro Musica. The core group of singers had a history of singing together in the SF Bach Choir and the Presidio Protestant Post Chapel Choir. The decision to strike out on their own came when one of the members was informed that since he joined Pro Musica, there was “too much jocularity in the bass section.” Shortly thereafter they reemerged as The Pacific Mozart Ensemble, rehearsing in the then new Julia Morgan Theater (alternate names for the group included the Morgan Tabernacle Choir).

First Performance: Sunday, June 28, 1980, 5 P.M.--- Julia Morgan Centre for the Performing Arts, College Avenue, Berkeley, suggested donation $3.50. Bach Cantata #106, "Gottes Zeit ist der allerbeste Zeit"; Songs by John Dowland; Mozart "Vesperae Solennes de Confessore" K.339---

== Collaborations ==
PME had a long history with the Berkeley Symphony and Kent Nagano. In 2005 Nagano recruited PME to open the Symphony's season with the Ligeti’s a cappella work Lux Aeterna. Other Berkeley symphony collaborations include Beethoven’s Christus am Ölberge, Stravinsky's Symphony of Psalms and Oedipus Rex, San Francisco composer David Sheinfeld's The Earth Is a Sounding Board, Busoni's Doktor Faustus, Olivier Messiaen's St. François d'Asisse, Beethoven's 9th Symphony, and Berlioz’s Romeo and Juliet. In 2006 members of PME performed the world premier of Kurt Rohde’s oratorio, Bitter Harvest.

In 2003 PME performed the Bernstein Mass with the Deutsche Symphonie-Orchester under the direction of Kent Nagano at the Berlin Philharmonie. In 2005, the Harmonia Mundi recording of the concert was nominated for a Grammy.

In the 1990s, PME collaborated with Dave Brubeck on performances of his oratorios, including “Gates of Justice." In 2006 the relationship was renewed when PME commissioned Brubeck to fill in one of the missing movements of Mozart's Mass in C Minor for their 25th anniversary concert.

They collaborated on numerous occasions with Meredith Monk, most recently traveling to New York in 2005 to participate in the 40th Anniversary Concert in Carnegie Hall as well as a performance at the World Financial Center Winter Garden, broadcast on WNYC.

In the fall of 2006, members of PME performed with Sufjan Stevens at Zellerbach Hall and John Zorn at Hertz Hall in Berkeley, CA.

== Website ==
- Official website
