= St. Mark's Episcopal Church (Berkeley, California) =

Episcopal Church in California

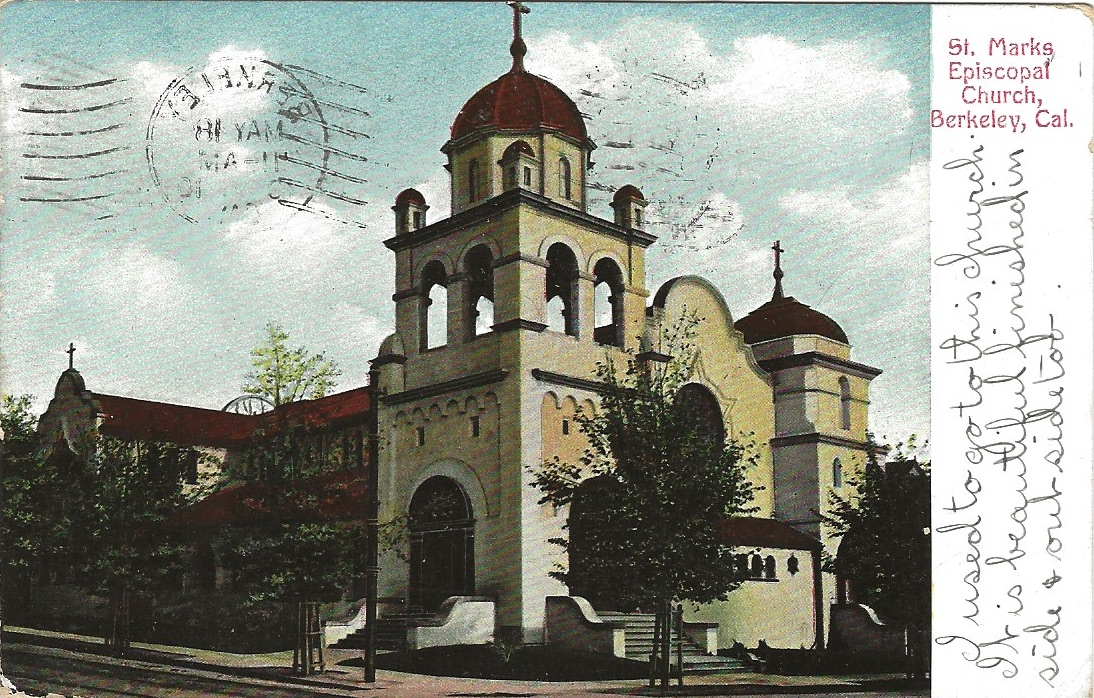
- St. Mark's Episcopal Church, Berkeley, California.

Religion
- Affiliation: Episcopal Church
- Ecclesiastical or organizational status: yes
- Leadership: Vestry
- Year consecrated: 1877
- Status: Active

Location
- Location: Berkeley, California
- Interactive map of St. Mark's Episcopal Church
- Coordinates: 37°52′05″N 122°15′48″W

Architecture
- Architect: William Curlett
- Style: Mission Revival architecture
- Completed: 1902

Website
- St. Mark's Episcopal Church

St. Mark's Episcopal Church is a parish of the Episcopal Church in Berkeley, California, founded in 1877 by two University of California faculty families in a Victorian style, wood-frame parish house in 1877. It was rebuilt in 1902, in the Mission Revival style designed by William Curlett. The church supports special programs for students and the community of Berkeley. The rector is the Rev. Blake Sawicky.

== History ==
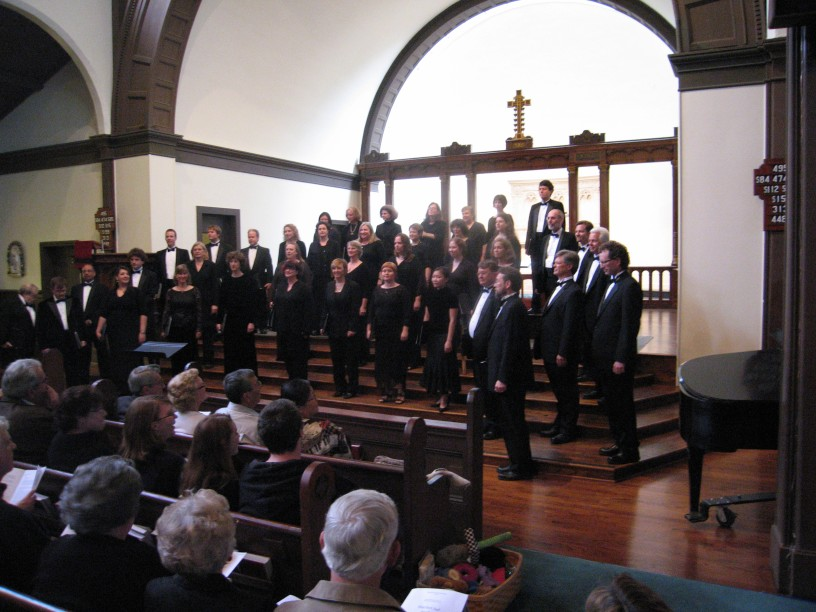
The Pacific Mozart Ensemble performing Richard Strauss's Deutsche Motette at St Marks Episcopalian Church in March 2007. Photo by Doug Boyd.

St. Mark's Church was established in 1877, by two University of California faculty families. The Victorian styled, wood-frame parish house was replaced in 1902, by a church designed by architect, William Curlett (1845–1914) in the Mission Revival style. The church is dedicated to Rev. William Ingraham Kip, California's first Protestant Episcopal bishop. St. Mark's it is the first building in Berkeley of the Mission Revival style.

The historic church is located on 2300 Bancroft Way at Ellsworth Street. It has a square-shaped bell tower with two arched entrances on the first floor with an open loggia. Recent restoration reopened the arched openings. The octagonal domed roof has a cross at the top. The church has two stained-glass rose windows by Louis Comfort Tiffany on the west side of the church, that was installed in 1916. A second bell tower with a domed roof is on the southwest corner. The shape of the church is modeled after the Mission San Carlos Borromeo de Carmelo in Carmel-by-the-Sea.

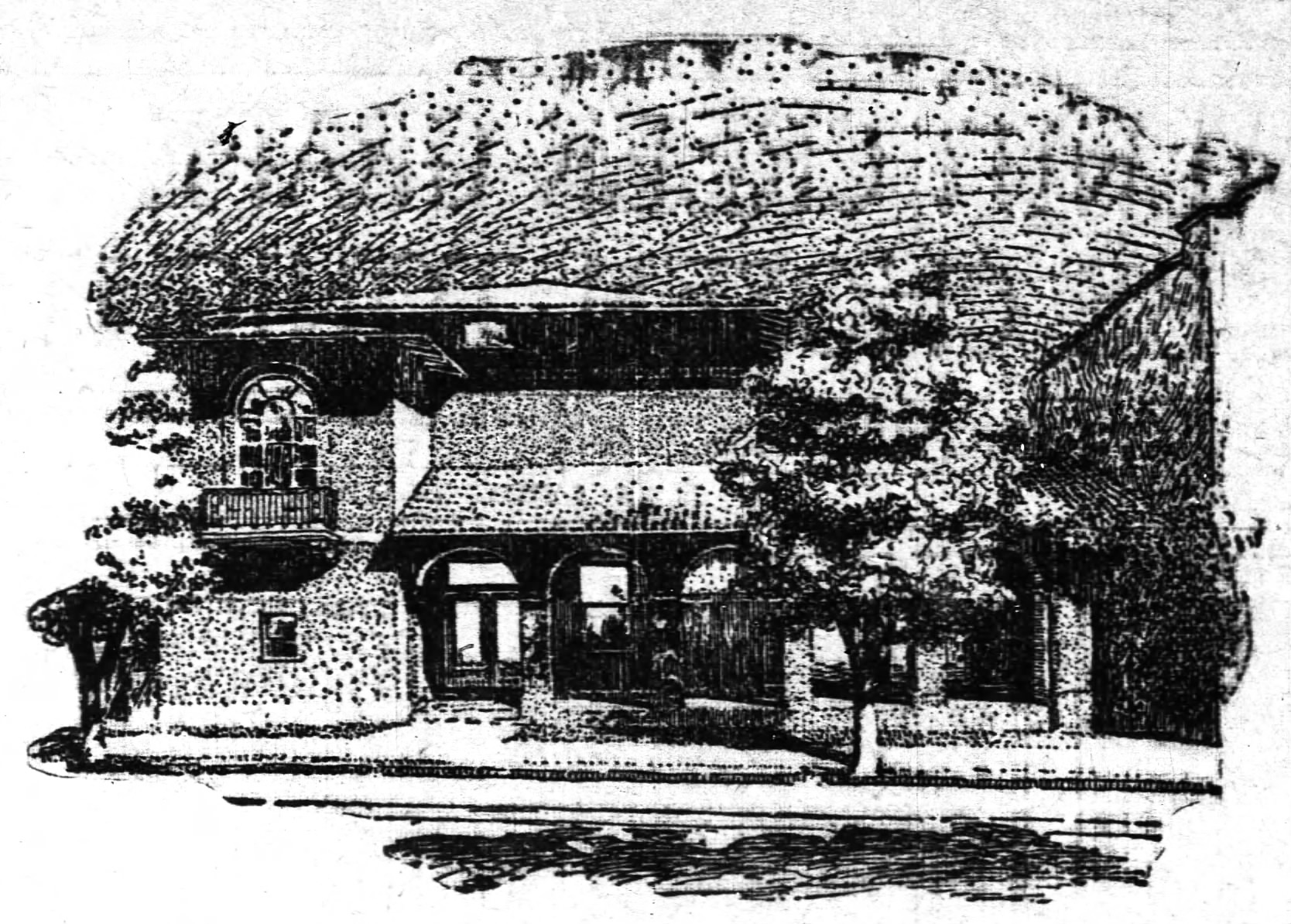
St. Mark's parish house (1911).

In 1911, the church parish house, that was used for 16 years, was torn down to build a new parish house, designed by architect Willis Polk. The new house included a two-story house with an auditorium, Sunday school rooms, library, and office space. The new memorial parish house was a memorial gift by children of the late Mrs. James Palache.

The pulpit was carved by the interior design firm, Vickery, Atkins & Torrey of San Francisco. St. Mark's is known for its music. It has an organ built by Dutch organ builder Dirk Andries Flentrop of Zaandam, Holland in 1971. The Pacific Mozart Ensemble performed Richard Strauss's Deutsche Motette at St Mark's Church in March 2007.

== See also ==
- Anglicanism
- Christianity
- List of Anglican churches
- St. Mark's Episcopal Church (disambiguation)
