= St Mark's Church, Brithdir =

Coordinates: 52.7487°N 3.8332°W

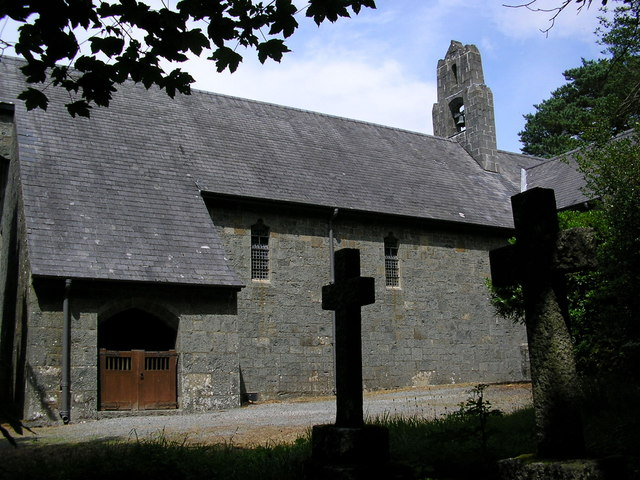
- St Mark's Church, Brithdir, from the south

- Location in Gwynedd
- OS grid reference: SH 764 184
- Location: Brithdir, Gwynedd
- Country: Wales
- Denomination: Church in Wales
- Website: Friends of Friendless Churches

History
- Founder: Mrs Louisa Tooth
- Dedication: Saint Mark
- Consecrated: 26 April 1898

Architecture
- Functional status: Redundant
- Heritage designation: Grade I
- Designated: 26 May 1995
- Architect: Henry Wilson
- Architectural type: Church
- Style: Arts and Crafts
- Groundbreaking: 1895
- Completed: 1898

Specifications
- Materials: Local grey-green ashlar stone, slate roofs

St Mark's Church, Brithdir, is a redundant church in the hamlet of Brithdir, Gwynedd, Wales. It is designated by Cadw as a Grade I listed building, and is under the care of the Friends of Friendless Churches. It is considered to be one of the finest Arts and Crafts churches in Wales.

== History ==
The building of the church started in 1895; it was completed in 1898 and was consecrated on 26 April. The church was designed by Henry Wilson who was a "leading figure of the Arts and Crafts Movement". It was commissioned by Mrs Louisa Tooth in memory of her second husband Charles Tooth, who had been chaplain and founder of the Anglican St Mark's English Church, Florence and a brother of Arthur Tooth and Burton upon Trent and Australian based brewers Robert Tooth, Edwin Tooth (1822–1858) and Frederick Tooth (1827–1893). Louisa Tooth was the daughter of Edward Lloyd Edward whose family owned Cerrig Llwydion Hall in Denbighshire. Her first husband was Richard Meredyth Richards a JP and high sheriff for the county of Merionethshire.

Since being declared redundant, it has been in the care of the Friends of Friendless Churches.

== Architecture ==
=== Exterior ===
The church is constructed in brick, and faced with local grey-green ashlar stone; it has slate roofs. The "external stonework was intended to be left 'untooled' (rough)", because the architect "wished the church to appear as if it had sprung out of the soil, instead of being planted down on it". Its plan consists of a nave with north and south porches, and a chancel with north and south transepts. In the west end are two tiers of ogee-headed windows. Between the windows in the upper tier is a cross in relief. There are similar windows, asymmetrically placed, on the north and south sides of the church. On the roof, in a position to the west of the transepts, is a two-tier bellcote. In its lower tier is a round-headed arch containing the bell, with a smaller round-arched opening above. At the east end is a stepped buttress containing a round-arched lancet window, on each side of which is an ogee-headed window.

=== Interior ===
The interior of the church is rendered and painted, with "rich warm red" nave walls, a blue nave roof and "warm cream, almost a yellow" colour for the chancel. The nave has three-bay roof; its ceiling is canted and has a plain cornice. The north and south doors are in Art Nouveau style. These are constructed in oak and teak in chevron designs, and have mother-of-pearl decoration at the points of the chevrons. The lead font has a circular bowl carried on an octagonal column. It was cast at the Central School of Art and Design in London, and is decorated with leaf patterns and Christian monograms. The pulpit and retable were designed by Wilson, and are constructed from beaten and moulded copper. They are in Arts and Crafts style, the pulpit being decorated with grapes and texts from the Vulgate.

The chancel is groin vaulted. The north transept contains an organ and in the south transept is a gallery. The stalls in the chancel are made from Spanish chestnut; they were designed by Wilson and carved by Arthur Grove with zoomorphic images. These include a hare, a tortoise, squirrels, rabbits, an owl, a mouse, a kingfisher, and a dolphin. The altar rails contain panels between large posts. The altar frontal was designed by Wilson; it is in cast copper and contains figurative panels. These depict, on the left, the Annunciation with the Virgin Mary and a dove facing a kneeling angel and, on the extreme right, the Rev Tooth and his guardian angel. The reredos is also in beaten copper; it depicts a vine springing from a chalice, and at the sides are bluebells springing from the monogram "IHS". The single-manual organ was built by Peter Conacher of Huddersfield in 1901.

=== Churchyard ===
The churchyard contains the Commonwealth war grave of a Royal Flying Corps officer of the First World War.

== Critique ==
The church is listed Grade I by Cadw because it is "a highly important and unaltered example of the work of Henry Wilson, a leading figure of the Arts and Crafts Movement. St Mary's [sic], Brithdir ranks amongst his major works in Britain". It is "an exceptionally important and advanced work for its date". The church is considered to be "one of the few full blooded Arts and Crafts churches in Wales", and "one of the pre-eminent churches of the Arts and Crafts Movement". "The interior decoration and fittings are arguably the most complete and high-quality Arts and Crafts work in Wales."

== Gallery ==
Inside

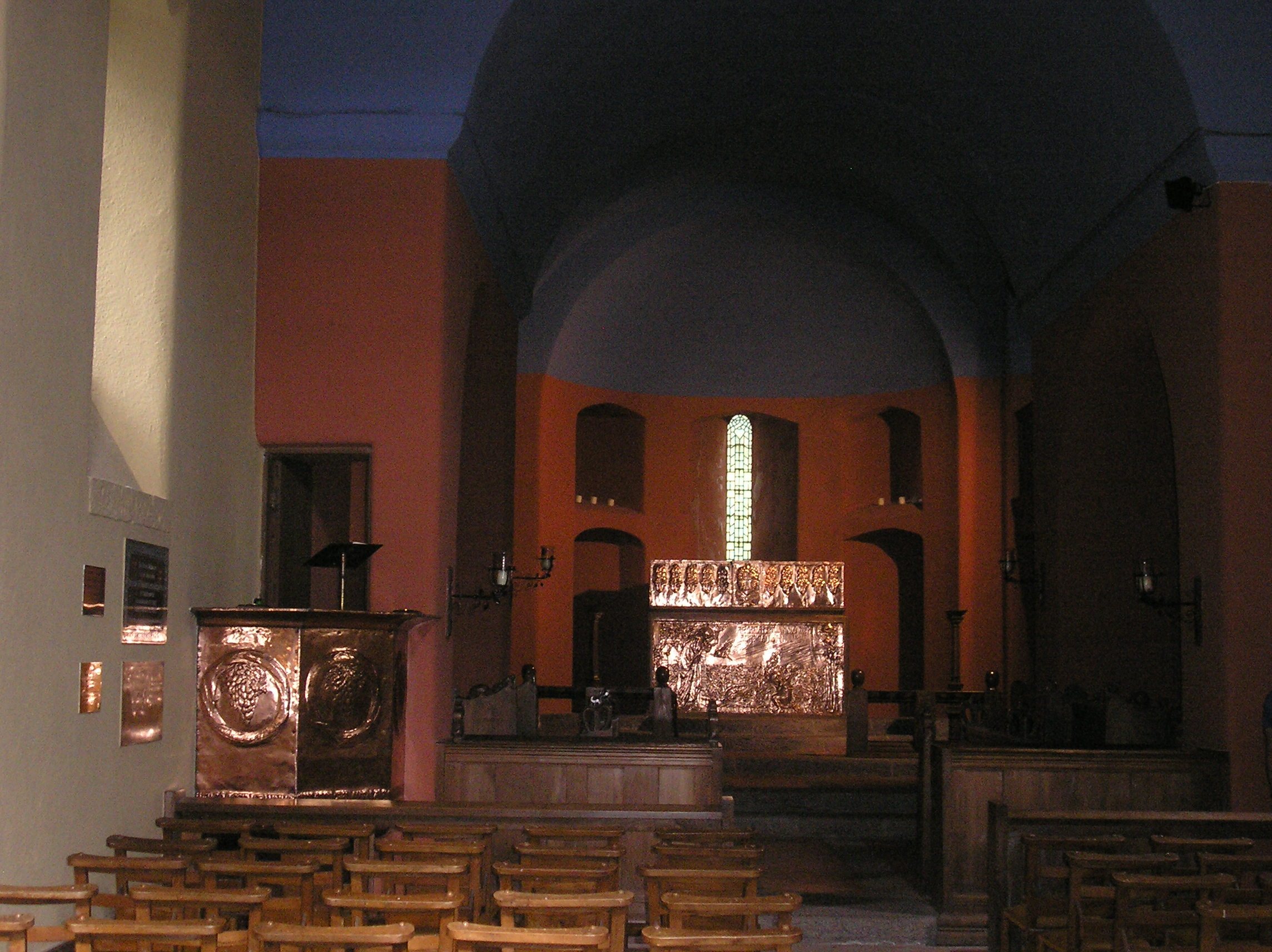
Interior

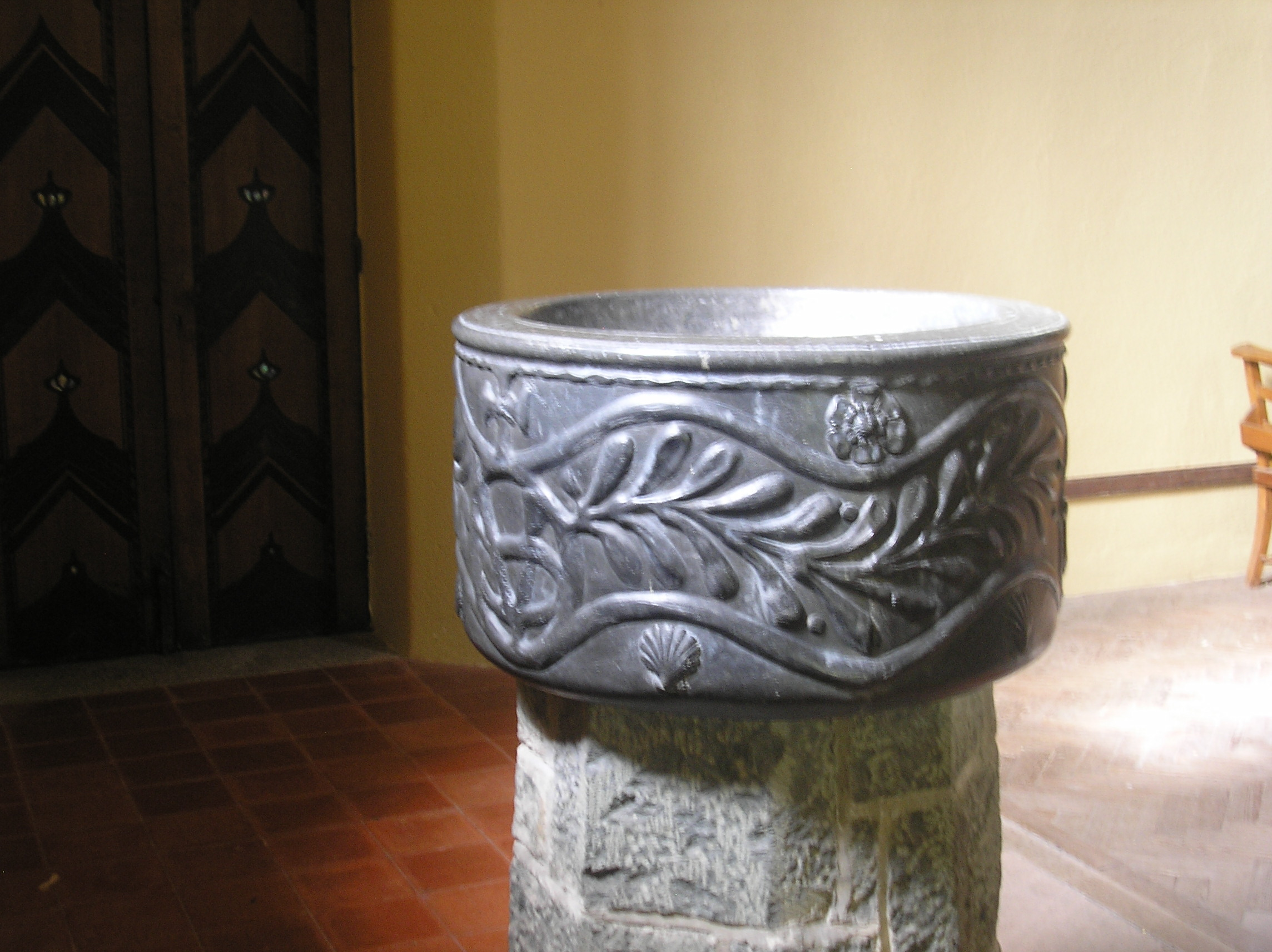
Font

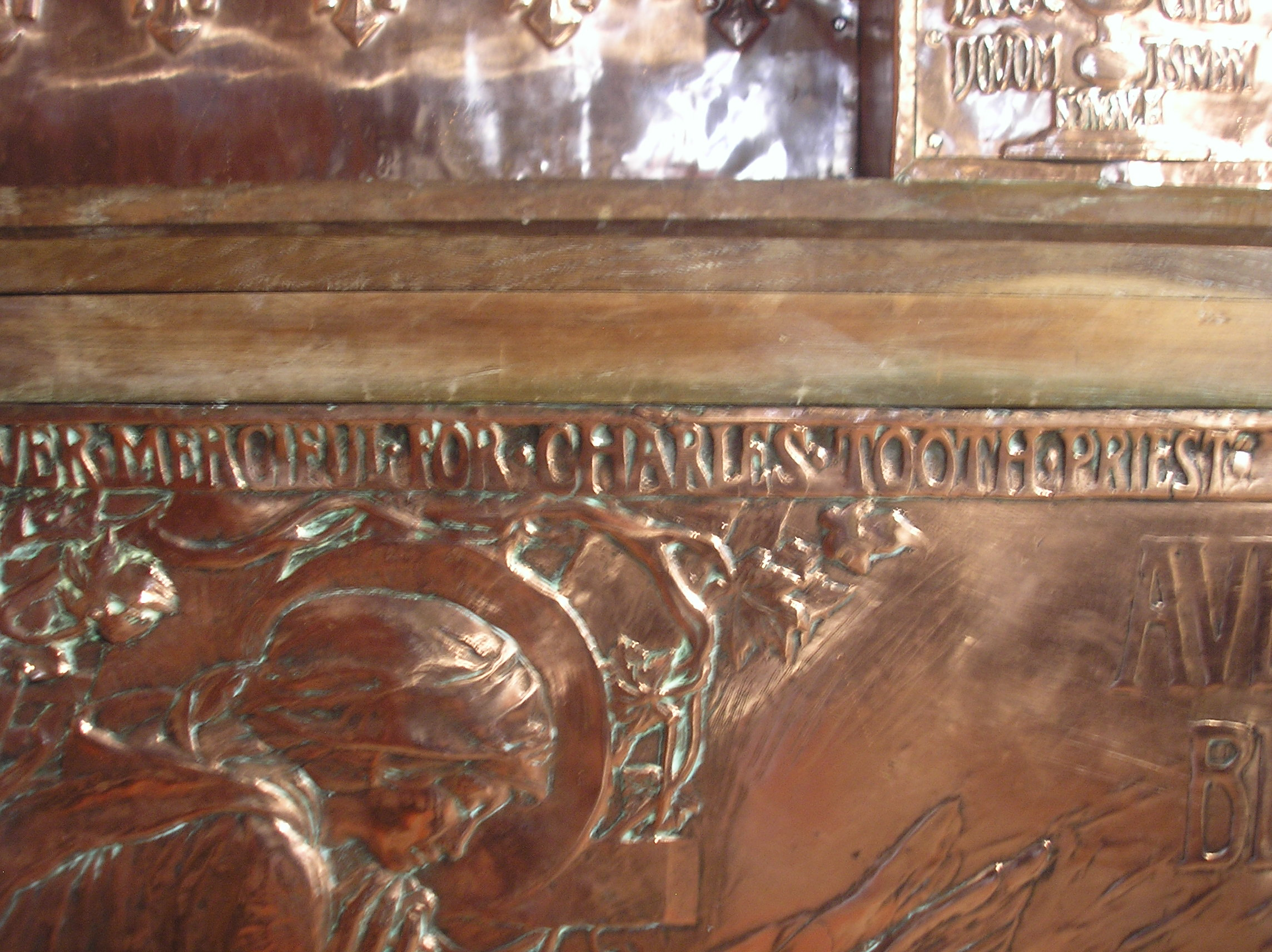
Left side of altar panel about Charles Tooth, brother of Arthur Tooth

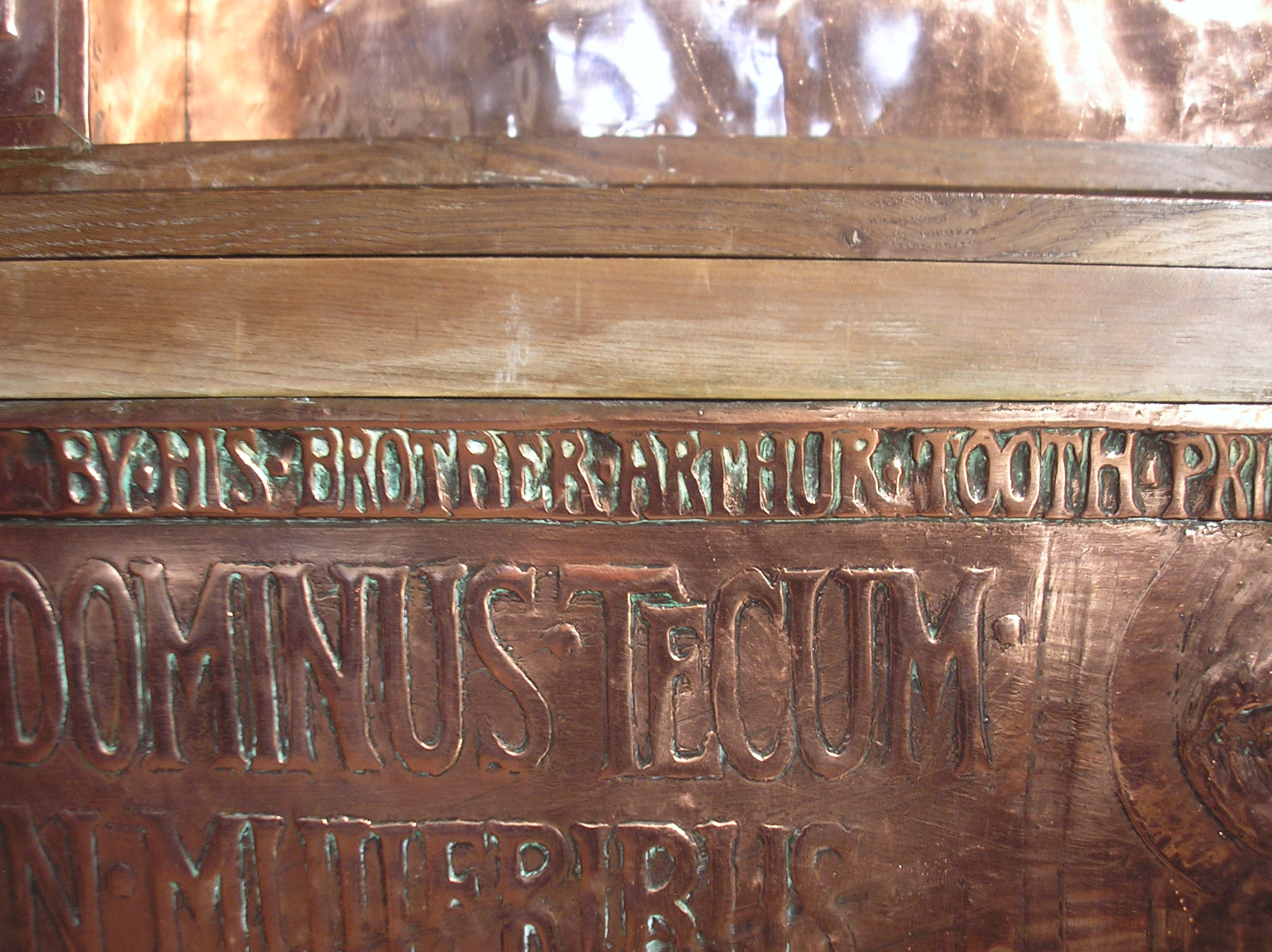
Altar panel showing its relation to Arthur Tooth

Outside

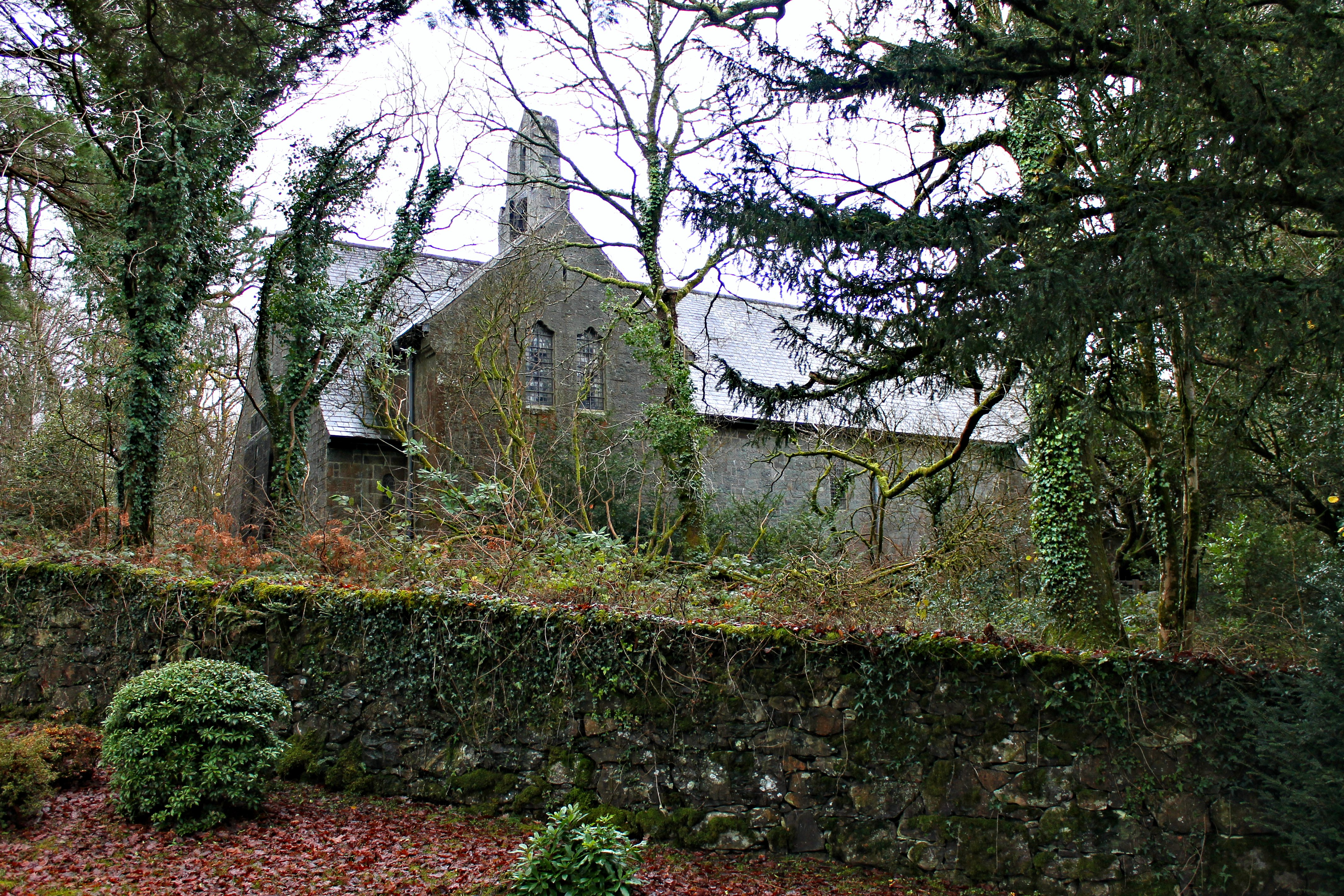
Church front

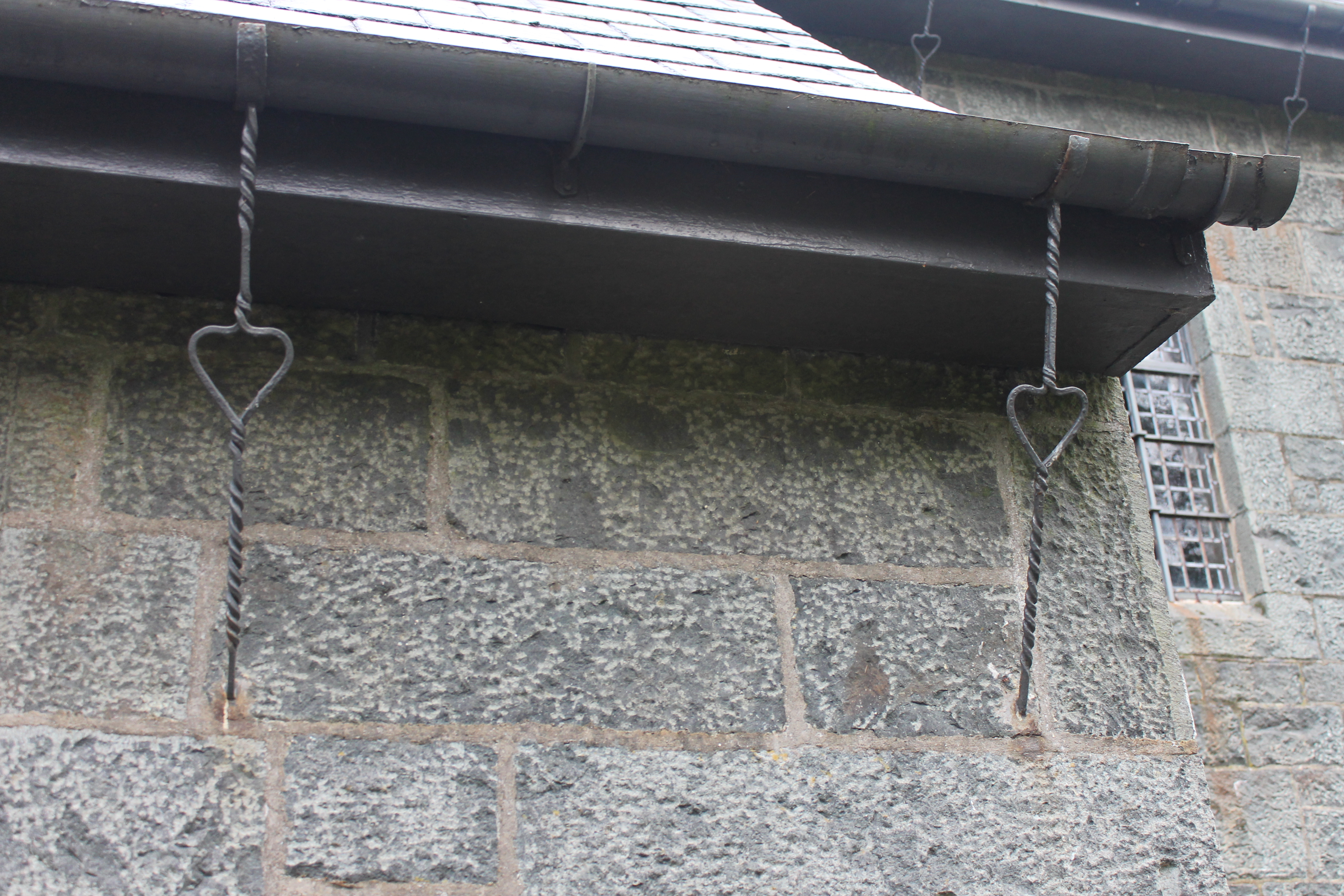
Arts and Crafts style on straps

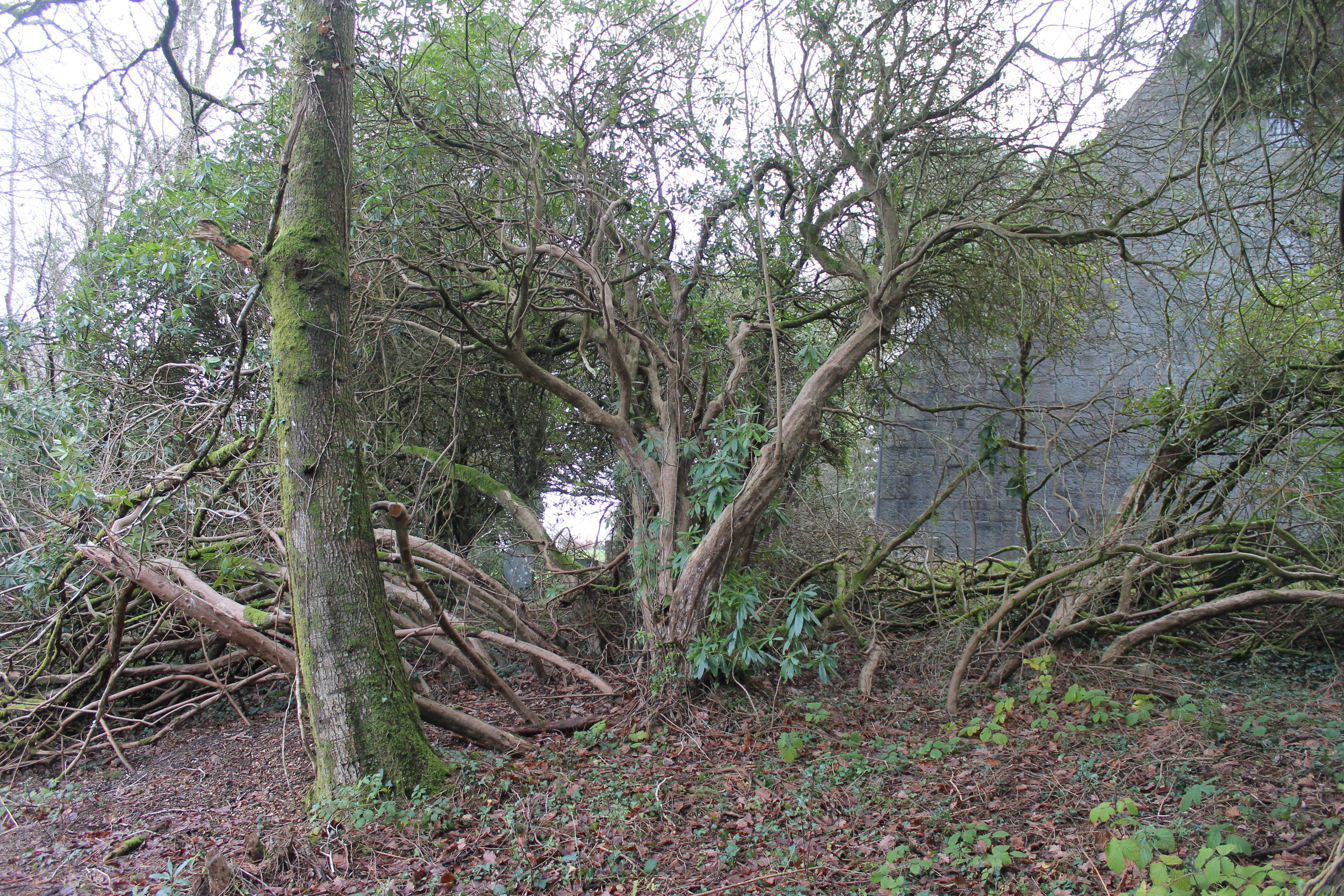
Old yew tree with new growth

Back

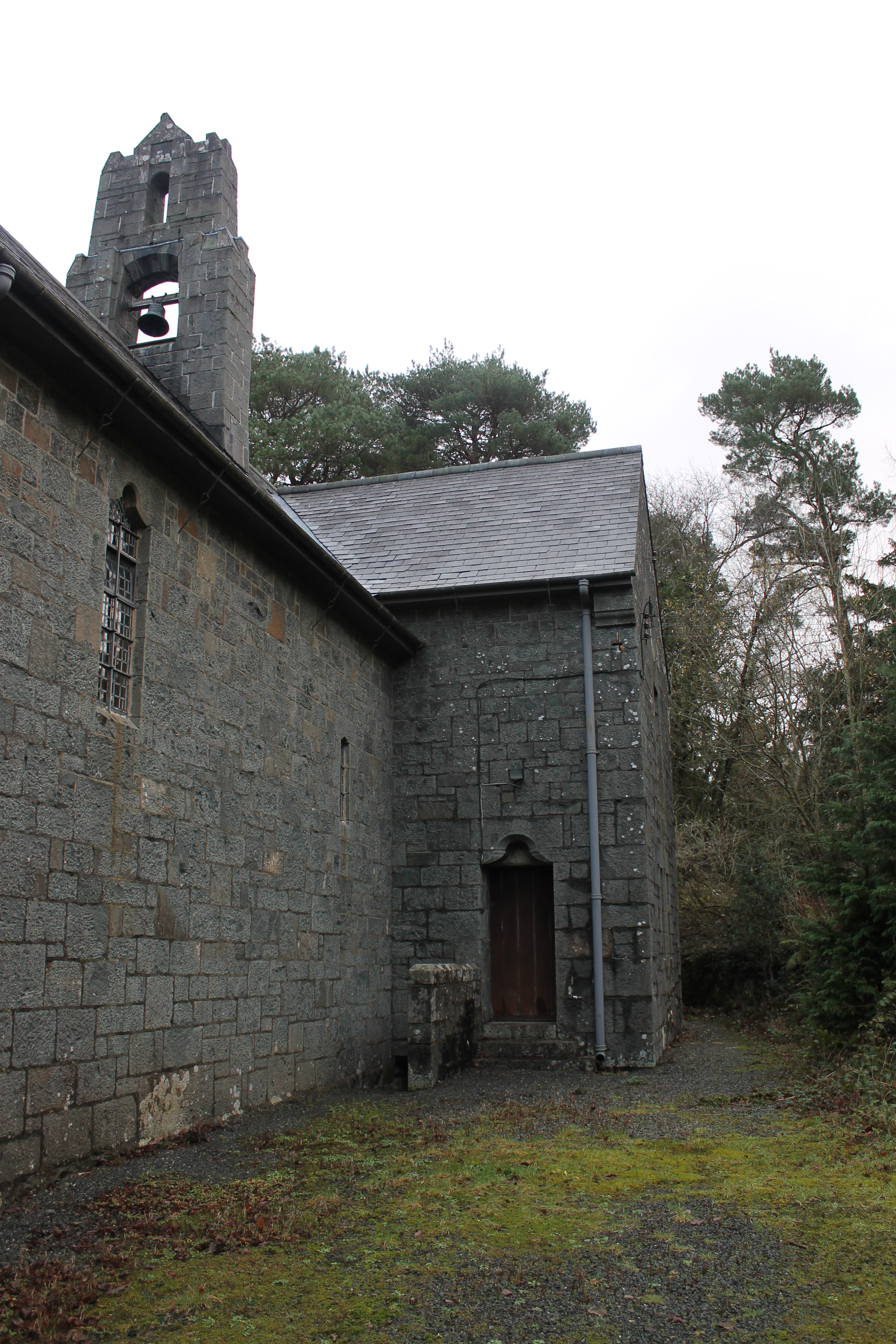
Bell tower and back of church

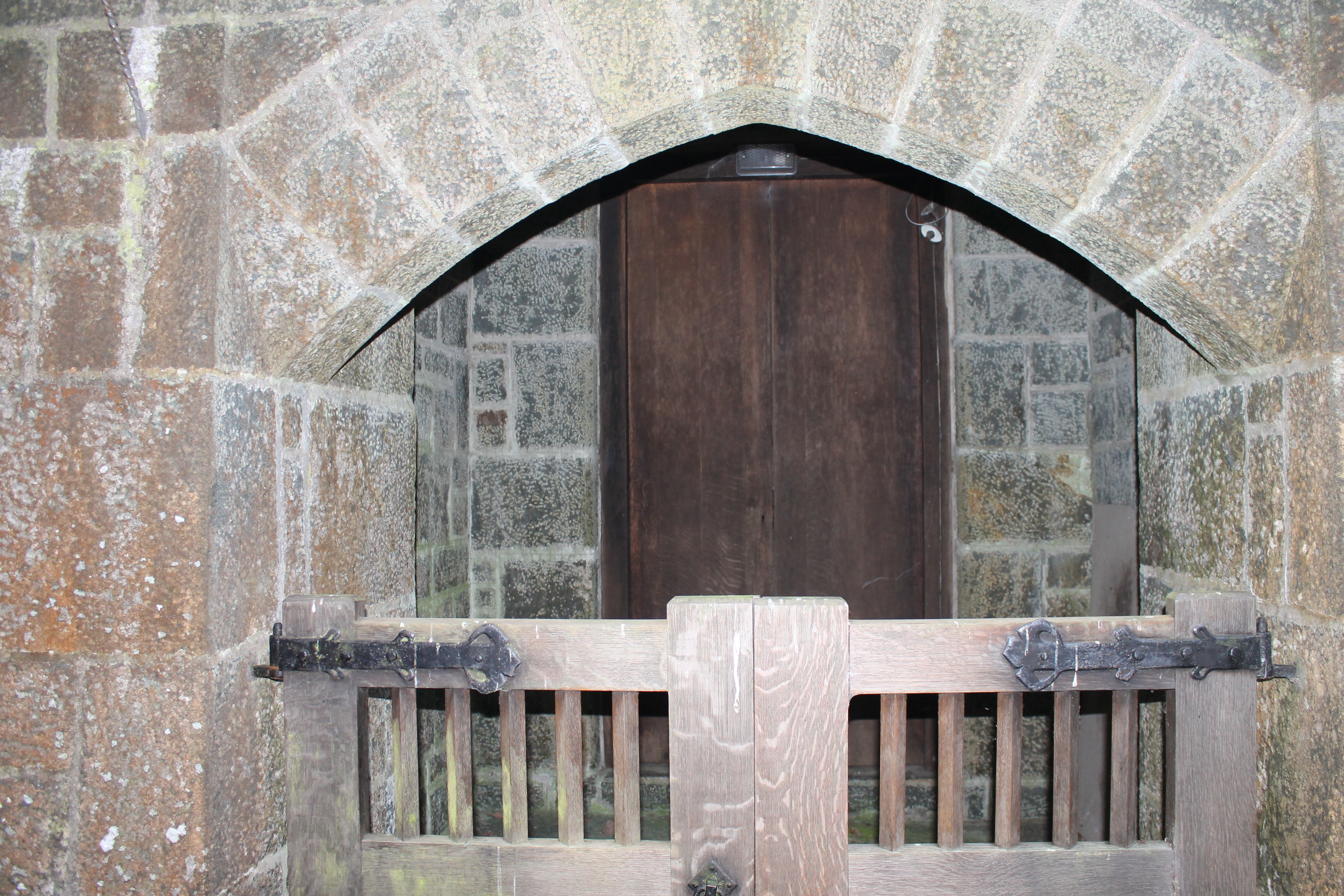
Porch
