= St. Mark's Episcopal Church (Tonopah, Nevada) =

Historic church in Nevada, United States

- St. Marks P. E. Church
- U.S. National Register of Historic Places
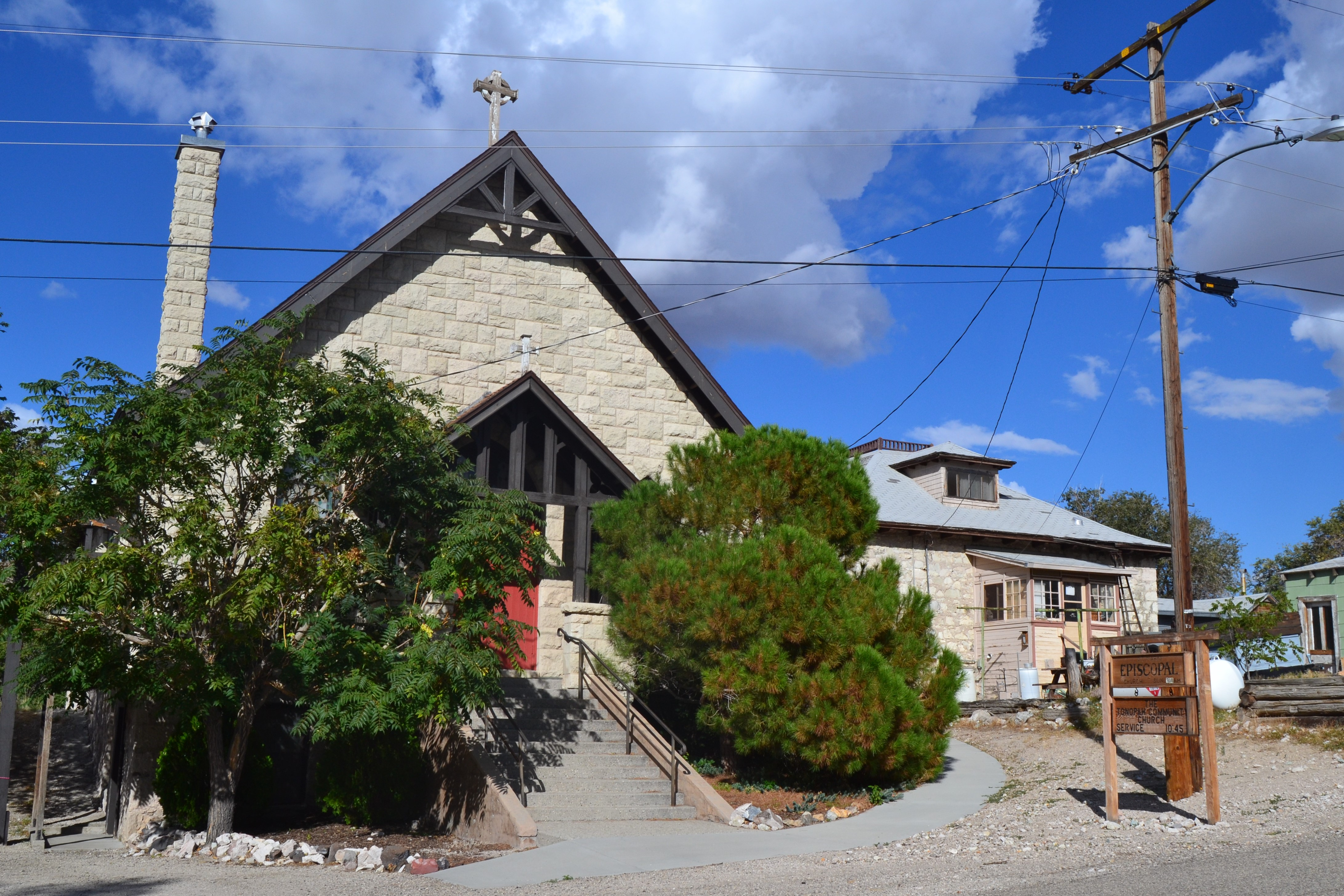

- Location within Nevada Location within the United States
- Location: 210 University Street. Tonopah, Nevada
- Coordinates: 38.06523°N 117.23148°W
- Area: less than one acre
- Built: 1906–07
- Built by: Burdick, E.E.
- Architect: Lyons, G.B.
- Architectural style: Gothic, Victorian
- MPS: Tonopah MRA
- NRHP reference No.: 82003246
- Added to NRHP: May 20, 1982

St. Mark's Episcopal Church, also known as St. Marks P.E. Church, is a historic church located at 210 University Street in Tonopah, Nevada, United States. The church was built from 1906 to 1907 by stonemason E.E. Burdick. Burdick's work on the church has been called "some of the finest craftsmanship to be found in Tonopah". Architect G.B. Lyons designed the church in the Gothic Revival style; his design features Gothic arches at the windows and front entrance and gables topped with crosses on the roof and the entrance.

The church was added to the National Register of Historic Places on May 20, 1982.

The E.E. Burdick House, next door, built by Burdick for use as his own residence, was later purchased by the church for use as a rectory, and is also National Register-listed.
