= St. Mark Church (Stratford, Connecticut) =

Coordinates: 41°13′40.30″N 73°07′43.60″W

- St. Mark Church
- Location: 500 Wigwam Lane; Stratford, Connecticut
- Country: United States
- Denomination: Roman Catholic
- Website: http://www.saintmarkchurchstratford.org

History
- Founded: May 25, 1960
- Founder: Bishop Lawrence J. Shehan
- Dedicated: December 12, 1961

Administration
- Province: Hartford
- Diocese: Bridgeport

Clergy
- Bishop: Most Rev. Frank Caggiano
- Vicar: Rev. Russell Augustine
- Pastor: Rev. Birendra Soreng

St. Mark is a Roman Catholic church in Stratford, Connecticut, part of the Diocese of Bridgeport. The parish is located in Stratford's North End and was founded in 1960 by Bishop Lawrence Shehan.

== Facilities ==
Besides the church itself the grounds include an adoration chapel convent, social hall/gymnasium, kitchen, and religious education office.

=== School ===
The parish includes an elementary and middle school that hosts over 200 students from pre-K through eighth grade. In 2009 the school was named a U.S. Department of Education Blue Ribbon School of Excellence.
