= Crkva Svetog Marka =

Crkva Svetog Marka may refer to:

- St. Mark's Church, Belgrade
- St. Mark's Church, Zagreb
