= St. Martin de Porres Episcopal Church =

Episcopal Church in Alexandria, Virginia, United States

Coordinates: 38°46′20″N 77°6′5″W

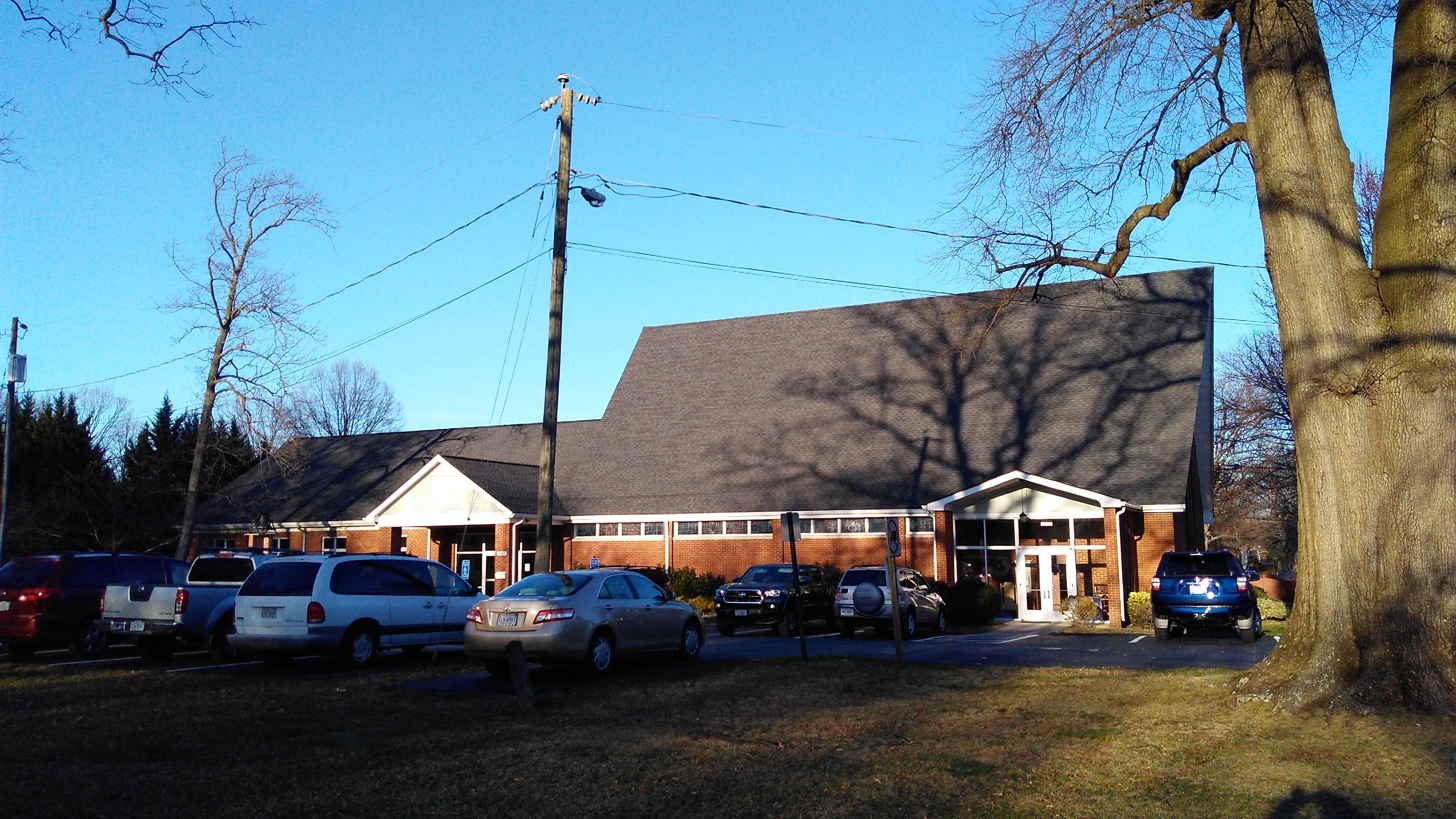
St. Martin de Porres Episcopal Church - St. Mark's Campus in 2017

St. Martin de Porres Episcopal Church was formed by the merger of three churches: Church of the Spirit, Olivet Episcopal Church and St. Mark's Episcopal Church (Alexandria VA) in November 2023. St. Martin de Porres Episcopal Church has two (2) campuses: St. Marks on 6744 S. Kings Highway in Alexandria VA 22306 and Olivet Chapel on 6701 Franconia Road in Franconia VA 22310.

The origins of the St Mark's Campus was originally located in Groveton, Virginia and was established as a non-demoninational church in 1880 as Groveton Mission located on Popkins Lane. It is one of several churches established by students of the Virginia Theological Seminary in Alexandria.

The church has been known as the Christ Episcopal Protestant Church of Groveton and Groveton Episcopal Chapel. In 1958, the current building located on S. Kings Highway was built and named St. Mark's Episcopal Church.

A historical marker was placed at the church in 2011 by the Fairfax County History Commission.

Olivet Episcopal Church's first historical reference was made by Richard Marshall Scott, Jr in his May 29, 1853, journal entry, noting his family's attendance at a religious service on the outskirts of his plantation, Bush Hill.

The Olivet Chapel was completed and dedicated for community worship on June 12, 1853.
