= St. Mark the Evangelist Church (New York City) =

Church in Manhattan, New York

Coordinates: 40°48′56.98″N 73°56′18.82″W

St. Mark the Evangelist's Church
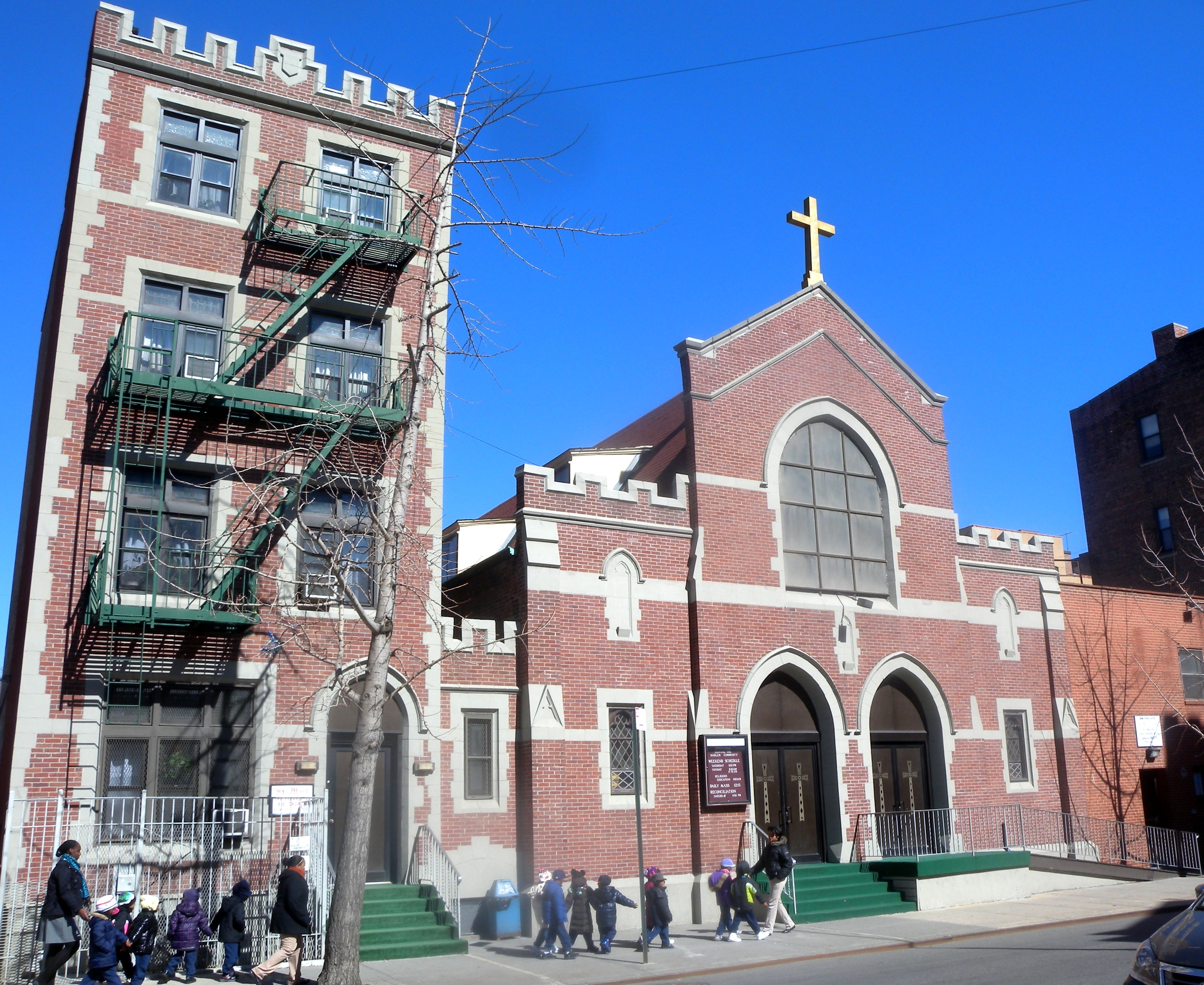
- Principal street-facing facade of church and attached rectory (in 2011)
- Interactive map of the St. Mark the Evangelist's Church area

General information
- Location: Harlem, Manhattan, New York City, New York, United States
- Construction started: 1914
- Client: Roman Catholic Archdiocese of New York

Design and construction
- Architect: Nicholas Serracino of 1170 Broadway

Website
- https://stmark138.com/

St. Mark the Evangelist Church is a historic Black Catholic parish in the Archdiocese of New York, in the northern Harlem section of Manhattan. The address is 59-61 West 138th Street and 195 East Lenox Avenue.

The parish was established in 1907 and has been staffed by the Holy Ghost Fathers since 1912. It claims to be the "first Catholic church in Harlem to welcome people of African descent from the southern parts of the United States and from the Caribbean". The first pastor, Fr Charles J. Plunkett, had a brick church built in 1914 to designs by Nicholas Serracino for $12,000.

A former pastor, Fr Freddy A. Washington, was accused of child sex abuse in 2017, though the case was later dismissed.

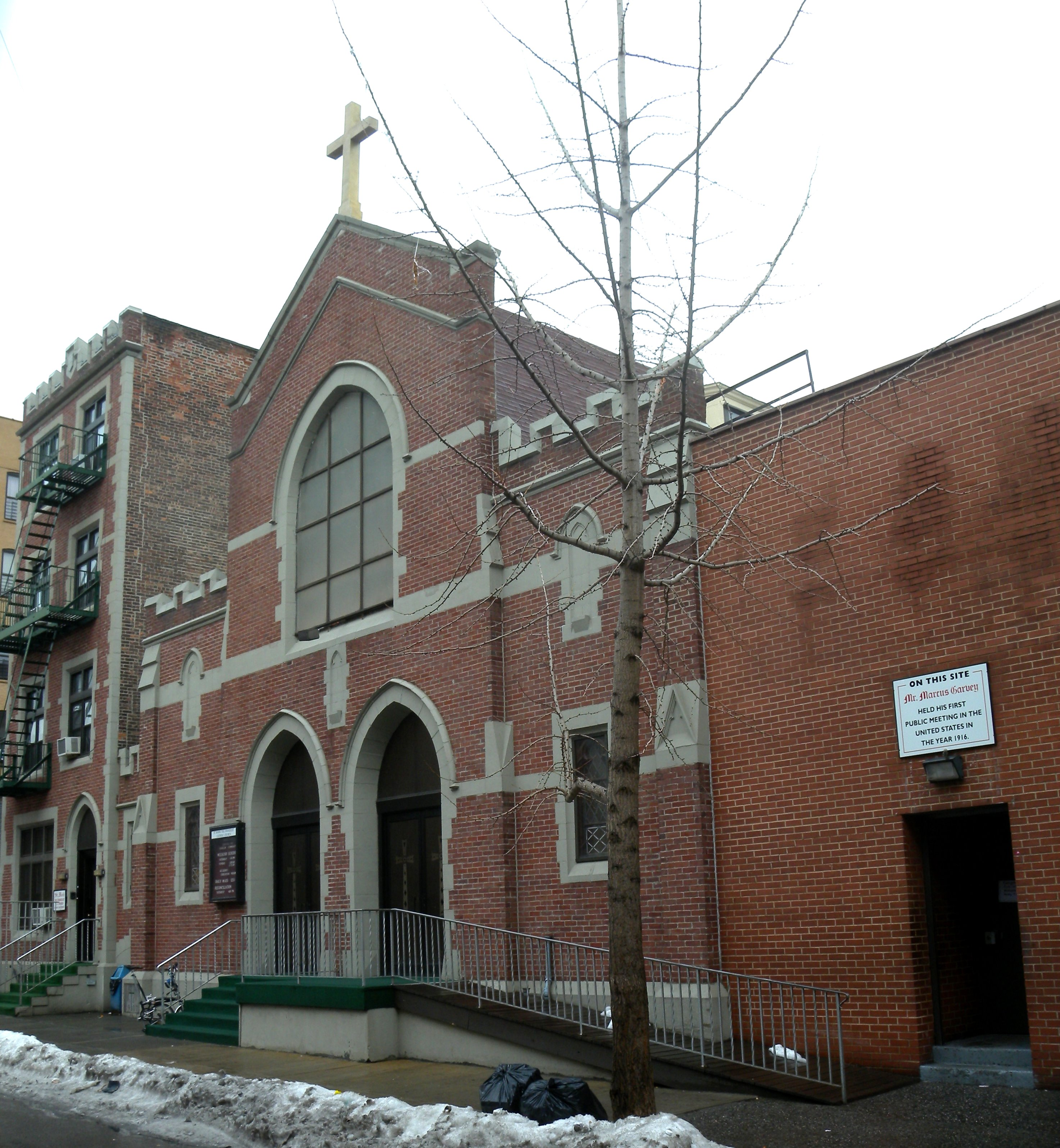
Street facade of church (in 2011)
