= St. Mark's Episcopal Church (Louisville, Kentucky) =

Church in Kentucky, United States

Coordinates: 38°15′15.4″N 85°41′21.9″W

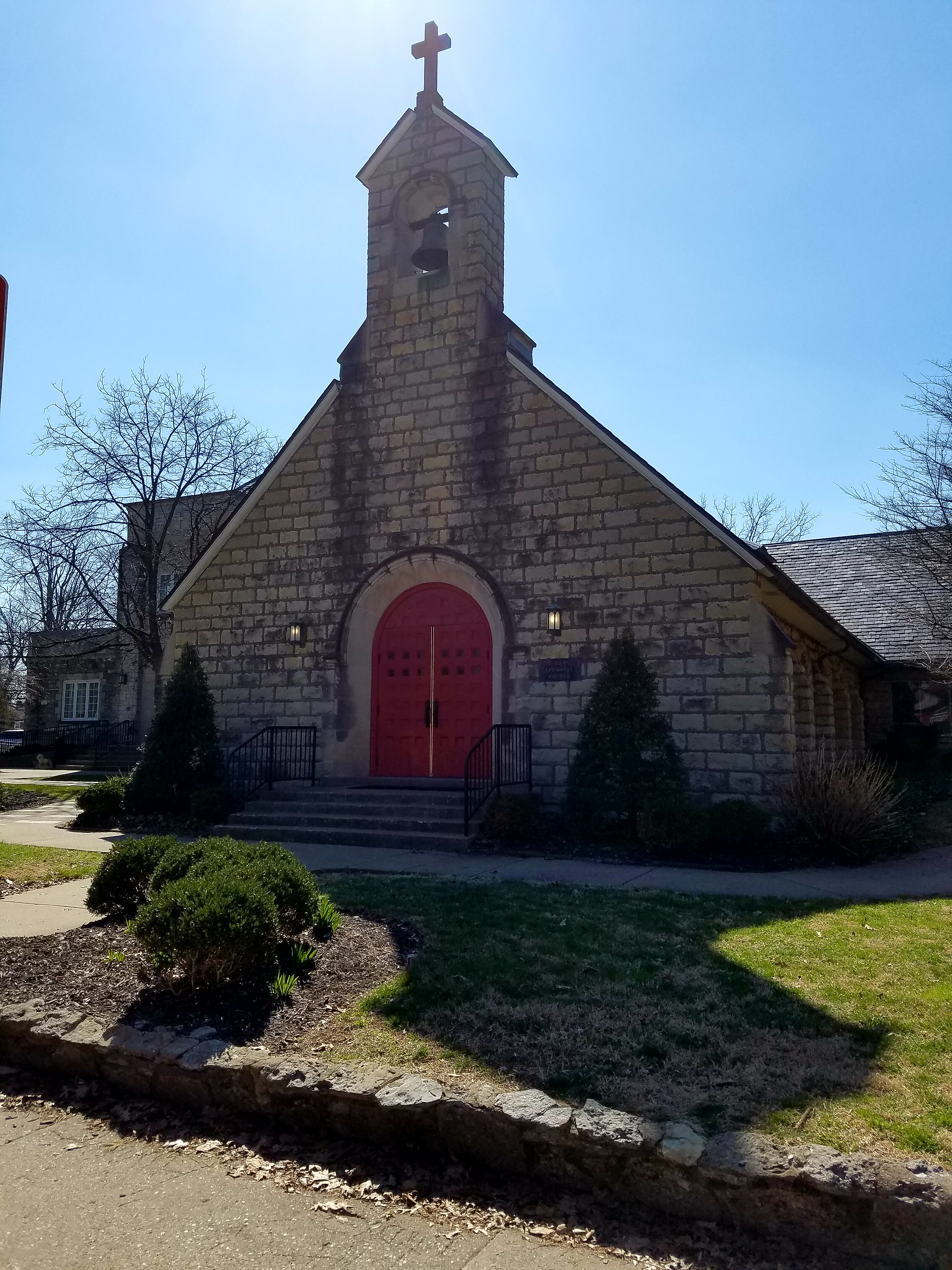
Front of St. Mark's Episcopal Church

St. Mark's Episcopal Church is located in the Crescent Hill historic district, on Frankfort Avenue which began as Louisville and Lexington turnpike in the 1850s. The church is located at the corner of Frankfort and Kennedy Avenues in Louisville, Kentucky.

The church was founded as a missionary parish in 1891. The parish purchased the lot upon which the church was built in 1895. The first service was held in the new church on June 12, 1895.

Today the church is active member parish of the Episcopal Diocese of Kentucky.
