= Saint Mark's Coptic Orthodox Church =

Saint Mark's Coptic Orthodox Church may refer to:

== Egypt ==
- Saint Mark's Coptic Orthodox Cathedral, in Cairo, seat of the Coptic Orthodox Pope
- Saint Mark's Coptic Orthodox Cathedral (Alexandria)
- Saint Mark's Coptic Orthodox Cathedral, Azbakeya, Cairo
- Saint Mark Coptic Orthodox Church (Heliopolis)

== United States ==
- St. Mark Coptic Orthodox Church (Los Angeles), California
- St. Mark Coptic Orthodox Church (Centennial, Colorado), in the Denver metropolitan area
- St. Mark Coptic Orthodox Church (Burr Ridge, Illinois)
- St. Mark Coptic Orthodox Church (Jersey City, New Jersey)

== United Kingdom ==
- St Mark's Coptic Orthodox Church, London

== See also ==
- St. Mark's Church (disambiguation)
- Saint Mark's Cathedral (disambiguation)
- List of Coptic Orthodox churches in Australia, including Oceania and East Asia
- List of Coptic Orthodox churches in Canada
- List of Coptic Orthodox churches in the United States
