= St Mark's English Church, Florence =

Anglican church in Florence, Italy

Coordinates: 43°46′3.28″N 11°14′57.65″E

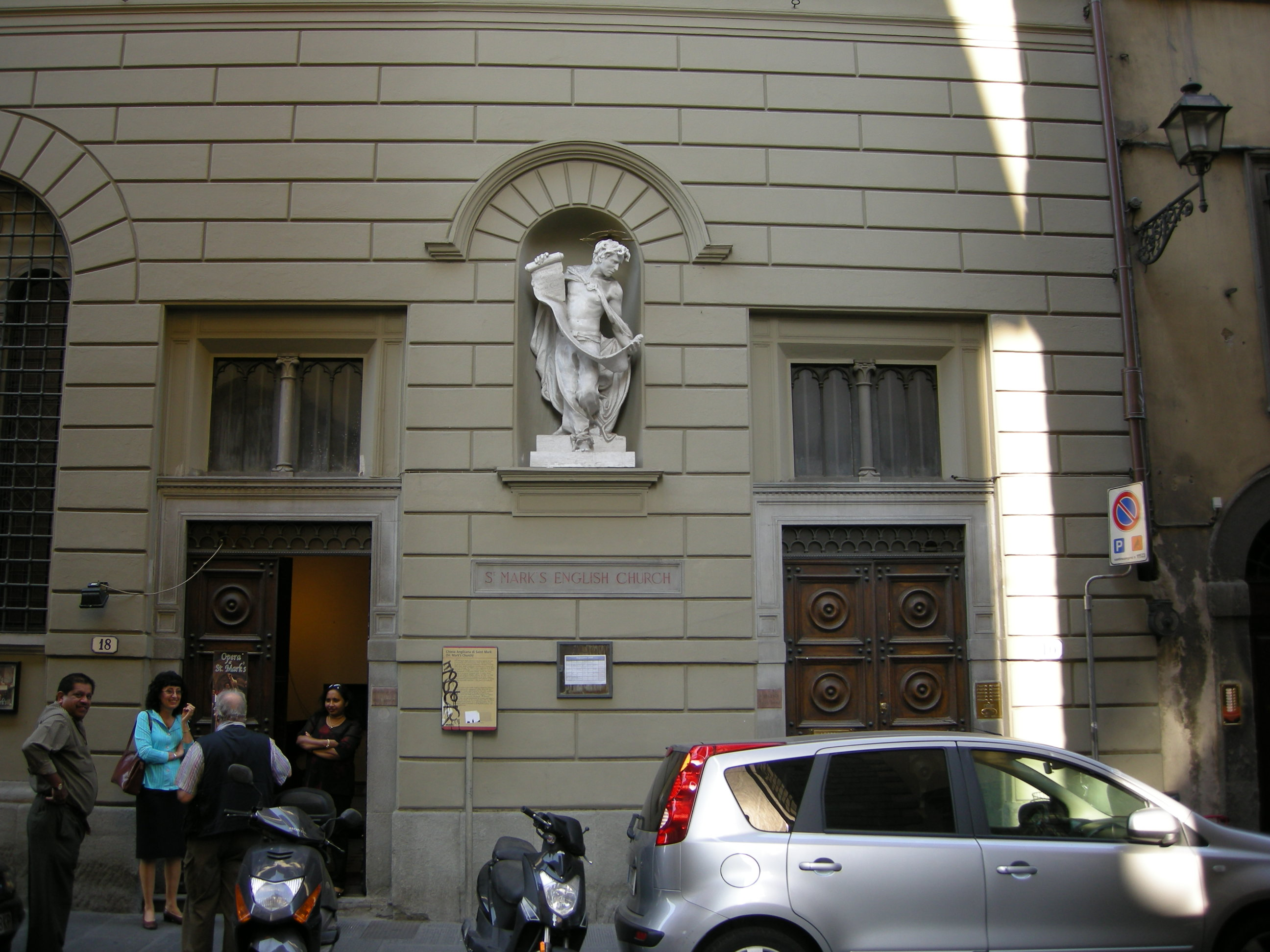
St Mark's English Church, exterior

Saint Mark's English Church is an Anglican church in Florence, Italy.

The church forms part of the chaplaincy (Note: A chaplaincy in this context is rather like a parish but with a more fluid membership. In this case it mainly serves three groups of English speakers: expatriates, students and tourists in Tuscany and Emilia-Romagna, with participants often travelling long distances.) of St Mark's Florence with Holy Cross Bologna, in the Diocese in Europe of the Church of England.

Father Chris Williams is the Chaplain. He arrived from St Mary's Church Liss, in the Diocese of Portsmouth, where he had been the Rector for 13 years.

St Mark's has music and cultural programmes, and offers a variety of different activities, including: a book club and armchair drama club; meditation; and various talks from authors and other institutions in Florence. Opera at St Mark's has been offering opera performances by its resident opera company for more than ten years.

== History ==
St Mark's was founded by the Reverend Charles Tooth as a centre of worship for Anglo-Catholic members of the Anglican Church in Florence. He started a house church at 1 Via dei Serragli in 1877 to teach Anglo-Catholic principles and celebrate the Eucharist daily during the week. In 1880, Tooth purchased a 15th-century palazzo to meet the new congregation's needs. John Roddam Spencer Stanhope designed and created the wall and ceiling decorations at his own expense. The first Eucharist was celebrated there on 1 May 1881, although chaplain and church were not licensed for service by the bishop until 1884. The premises were extended by the purchase of 16 Via Maggio in 1906.

The church was damaged by the 1966 flood of the Arno, resulting in the loss of George Frederick Bodley's 19th-century stencil work on the lower walls, although some survived behind a display cabinet.

St Mark's was the second Anglican church to be built in Florence. The British community in Florence has a long history and the chaplaincy began in the late 1820s. The first church, Holy Trinity, opened in the 1840s. Rebuilt in the 1890s, Trinity Church on the Via Lamarmara, is today a Waldensian Church.

== Architecture ==
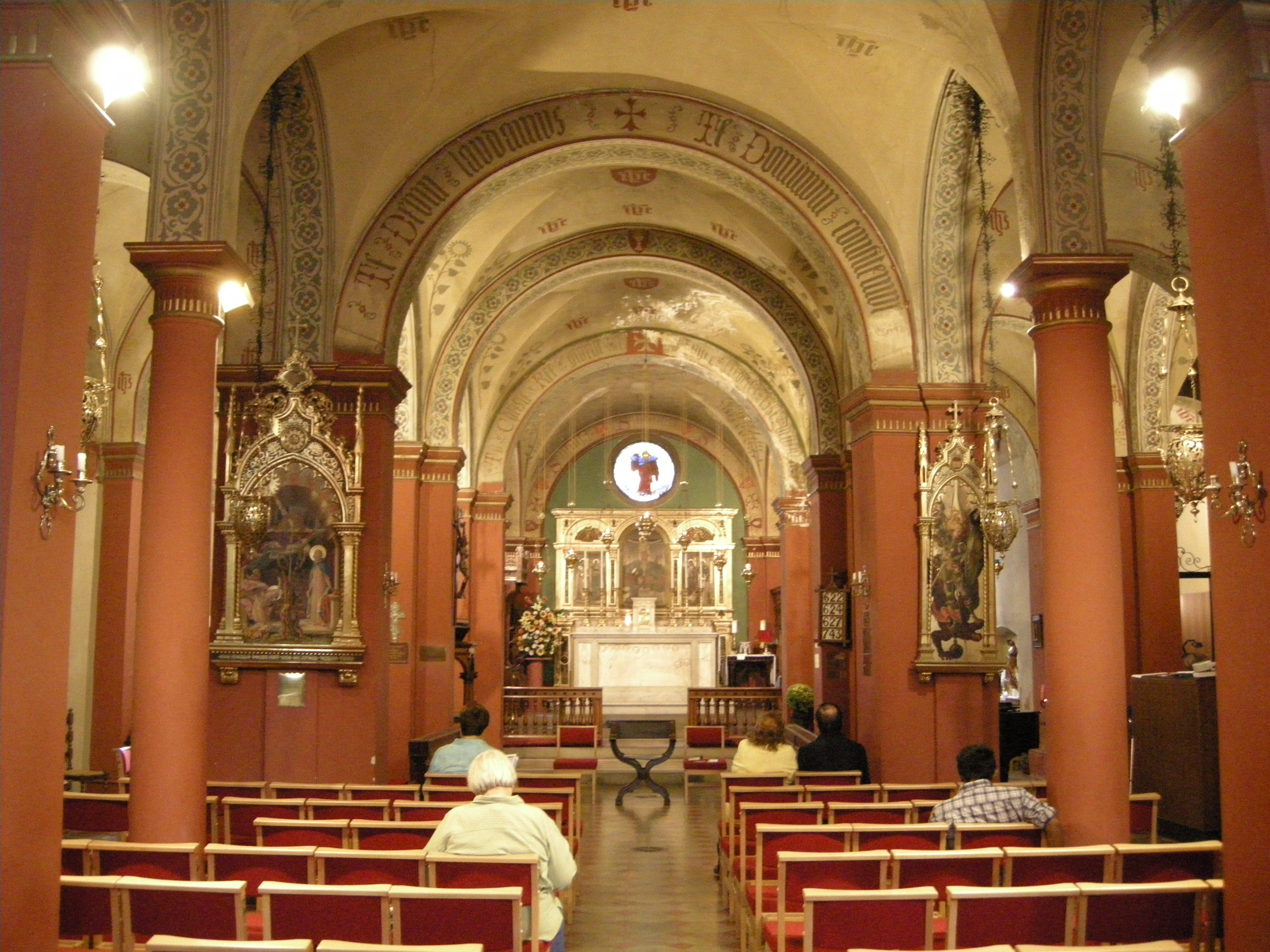
Interior: nave and altar

=== Exterior ===
The white marble statue in the niche over the main door is The Apotheosis of Saint Mark (2007–2008) by Jason Arkles. This is the first work by an American sculptor to have a permanent public location in Florence. It was commissioned by the then priest Fr Lawrence MacLean, who worked closely with Arkles on this project. They were able to find and use the same marble from which Michelangelo's David had once been carved.

=== Interior ===
The building was altered by Tooth, who turned the ground floor into a church with nave, aisles, transept and chancel, about 90 feet (27 m) long and seating 400. The interior is decorated in the Pre-Raphaelite style and the upper reaches of the church have floral motifs which the art historian Berenice Schreiner has described as having "a wonderful sense of naturalism".
