= Teatro San Gallo =

Coordinates: 45.434750°N 12.336868°E

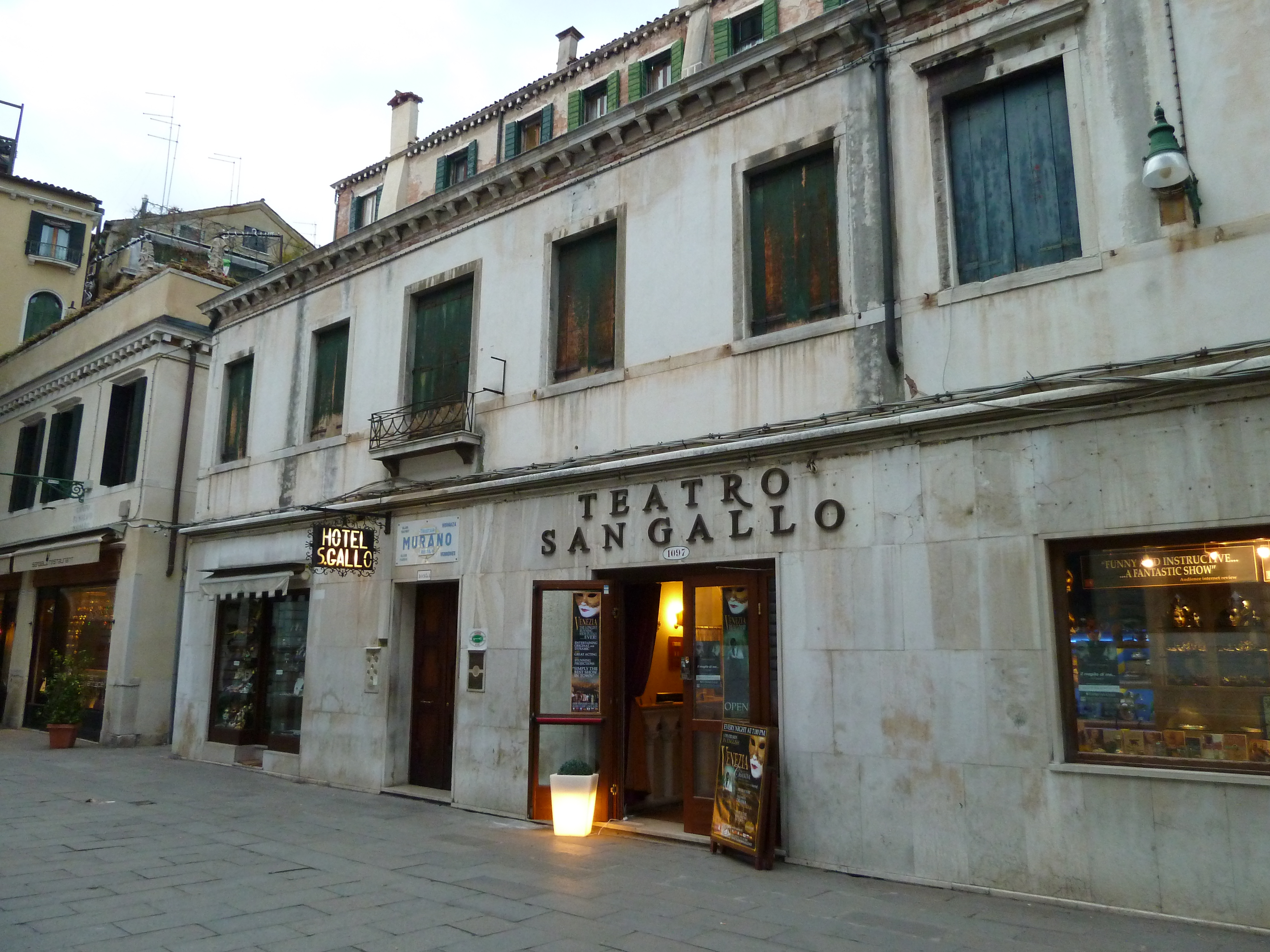
Entrance of the Teatro San Gallo

The Teatro San Gallo in Venice was built during the early part of the 20th century in the original courtyard of a 13th-century palazzo just behind Piazza San Marco in Venice. Some of the original features of the original palazzo are still visible in various parts of the theatre.

The theatre is located in Campo Rusolo o San Gallo, a small campo just behind Piazza San Marco and close to Bacino Orselo. The theatre has 260 seats. Since 2008 the theatre has been home to a nightly performance of Venezia The Show about Venice.
